= Silver rush =

Silver discovery triggering an onrush of miners seeking fortune

A silver rush is the silver-mining equivalent of a gold rush, where the discovery of silver-bearing ore sparks a mass migration of individuals seeking wealth in the new mining region.

Notable silver rushes have taken place in Mexico, Chile, the United States (Colorado, Nevada, California, Utah), and Canada (Cobalt, Ontario, and the Kootenay district of British Columbia). Several tourist towns owe their existence to silver rushes.

== History ==
Historically there were other "silver rushes", such as on the Attic peninsula near Athens, Greece, thousands of years ago. The silver mines of Laurion became famous for their exploitation and helped fund the new state of Athens. The term is also widely applied to the New World. Despite the larger-than-life image of the gold rush, the history of towns and industry in the North American West revolves much more around silver. This is partly because of the other minerals usually found with it – lead, tin, copper – and the more complicated smelting process associated with it because of the chemical complexity of its ores (usually galena). The line between a smelter town and a silver mining town is very slim in many cases, although copper mining towns typically also have large smelters (such as Anaconda, Montana) and industrial complexes associated with them.

The pursuit for silver often opens up other mineral deposits for development because of the variety of other useful ores that occur with it, especially in galena, its most common natural form. Hence the Boundary Country of British Columbia, just across the international border from Spokane, Washington, had a strong mining and smelting economy based on the non-silver components of galena, and the nearby city of Trail remains a functioning smelter town (long after the long-established industrial complex of the Boundary District has faded into a ghost town).

Hardrock mines tend to last longer than placer gold mines, and so silver mining towns last longer and have more time to develop than placer gold rush towns, which often peak within a few years. Silver mining towns typically last a few decades, with time to develop the opulence and luxury that only left the slightest traces in placer gold-fevered places such as Dawson City in the Klondike. By contrast, "silver cities" like Aspen, Colorado, and Nelson, British Columbia, often survived as functioning economies into the era of modernization and the advent of tourism.

== Examples ==
=== Canada ===
British Columbia

- Nelson, British Columbia, 1887
- Kaslo, British Columbia, circa 1889
- Slocan, British Columbia, "the Silvery Slocan", 1892

Ontario

- Cobalt, Ontario, "The Silver Capital of Canada", 1903

=== Chile ===
- Agua Amarga, 1811 (then part of the Spanish Empire)
- Chilean silver rush, Norte Chico, 1832–1840s)
  - Chañarcillo, 1832
  - Tres Puntas, 1848
- Caracoles, 1870 (then part of Bolivia)

=== Germany ===
- First Berggeschrey, Saxony, Ore Mountains, 1168
- Second Berggeschrey, Saxony, Ore Mountains, 1470
- Harz Mountains, Kingdom of Hanover

=== Mexico ===
Sonora

- Planchas de Plata district, 1736

Zacatecas

- Zacatecas, 1549

=== United States ===
California

- Calico Mountains (California)

Colorado

- Argentine district, 1865
- Aspen, Colorado
- Caribou, Colorado, 1869
- Telluride, Colorado
- Colorado Silver Boom
  - Leadville, Colorado, 1879

Nevada

- Comstock Lode, 1859
- Gold Hill and Virginia City
- Tonopah, Nevada, 1900

Utah

- Silver Reef, Utah

== See also ==
- Gold rush
- Silver standard
- Silver as an investment
- Sierra de la Plata, a mythic silver mountain
