= The Aragonese =

Spanish miners

In the history of mining in Chile and Argentina The Aragonese (Spanish: Los Aragoneses) were two renowned Spanish miners from Aragon active in the independence era. They are known for their mining discoveries, some of them historical and other legendary. During their time in the Andean mining districts they also garnered attention for their foreign manners and clothing.

Localities mentioned in the text. Silver ores in are shown grey and settlements with agriculture in green. Modern boundaries of Chile are shown.

The two miners, Juan Leito and Juan Echavarría (or Chavarría), arrived to the area of La Rioja in 1810 from Copiapó with the aim to reach Peru. In the account of Oreste Plath the two men were escaping the political upheaval in Chile through the inland roads of the Inca road system to reach the Royalist stronghold of Peru. Beginning their escape in January 1811 the men would have become lost and sought instead a mountain pass to Argentina. Near a lagoon known as La Ola they would have discovered silver after accidentally putting rocks of silver ore in the campfire. They took a selection of the most valuable rocks into their luggage and after marking the site of their discovery with a cross on a rock wall they continued east. While in Argentina, according to this account, they were at some point persecuted by the Patriots commanded by Manuel Belgrano in Tucumán. Juan Leite would have been captured and executed but not before telling his confessor where he had hidden the ore he had carried with him until little before his capture. The recovery of this treasure is said to have made the confessor rich for a few years.

The mountain pass used by the Aragonese to leave Chile is near San Francisco Pass where there are various possible routes east into the oasis-valley of Fiambalá.

Near Famatina The Aragonese are known to have made three successful mine claims soon after their arrival to the area. At times they arose suspicions of being Royalist spies of the Spanish government in Chile. According to Oreste Plath "some old miners believe that" the silver of Caracoles in Atacama Desert was discovered around 1811 by The Aragonese. Subsequently, the location of the outcrop is said to have been forgotten until its rediscovery in 1870.

Descriptions of the land routes and discoveries of The Aragonese circulated for decades among Chilean miners after their departure. In the folk memory of pirquineros of La Rioja it has been hinted The Aragonese were Jesuits in disguise looking to exploit the mines the company had before the suppression of the Society of Jesus in 1767.

== See also ==
- Agua Amarga
- Chilean silver rush
- Difunta Correa
