= Fidel Sepulveda Llanos =

Chilean academic

Fidel Sepúlveda Llanos (San José, Cobquecura, Chile, November 20, 1936 - Santiago, September 27, 2006) was a poet, researcher, Spanish and literary aesthetics professor, PhD in Hispanic Philology for the Universidad Complutense de Madrid and Member of the Chilean Academy of Language. He was one of the deepest experts and researchers of Chilean culture, cultural identity and intangible heritage of this country alongside Violeta Parra, Oreste Plath and Margot Loyola.

== Biography ==
Fidel Sepúlveda Llanos was born near to Cobquecura, in the south of Chile, on November 20, 1936. His father died when he was one year old and he lived his first years with his mother, two aunts and one uncle in the countryside. His uncle worked the land and was a carpenter. His aunts cultivated peasant traditions like singing.

At eleven years old he entered as a seminarian in the Franciscan fathers, first in Chillán then in Santiago, where he studied Latin, classical philosophy and theology where he stayed until twenty-one. Later he studied law at the University of Chile (where he graduated) and, in parallel, Pedagogy in Castilian on the Catholic University of Chile where he graduated in 1965. He achieved a degree in Hispanic philology (1978) and Philosophy Doctor (PhD) in Hispanic Philology(1980) with outstanding qualification in Complutense University of Madrid.

He was professor of the Metropolitan Educational Sciences University and the Catholic University of Chile, Director of the Institute of Aesthetics Catholic University of Chile for seventeen years in two periods (1971 - 1977 and 1993 - 2002) and of the journal Aisthesis of this mentioned research institute for 21 years (1982-2003). For twenty years he organized and directed the Program Traditional Arts and Culture , first in 1982 in the city of Concepción and later at the Catholic University of Chile in Santiago (1987-2003).

He was also a poet and essayist. His research and creation were expressed in more than 20 books, 70 essays and papers, and many conferences, awards and distinctions. He made numerous trips to foreign universities in their task of teaching and dissemination of Chilean culture and identity (Spain, Germany, France, Mexico, Bulgaria, etc.). Among the awards he received are: the International Prize Ibero-American Cooperation for best Latin dissertation in 1981 with his "Teoría de América en la novela actual" ("Theory of America in the current novel"), Prize Chilean Academy of Language for best literary creation of 1990 with his "A lo Humano y a lo divino" ("in the Human and the Divine"), his appointment as Full Member of the Chilean Academy of Language ( 1998) and the nomination to the "Premio a lo chileno"(2004) for his contribution to research and reflection on national identity and its artistic expressions.

He died in Santiago on September 27, 2006. His body rests in the land of their ancestors Cobquecura.
