= Pedro León Gallo Goyenechea =

Chilean politician (1830–1877)

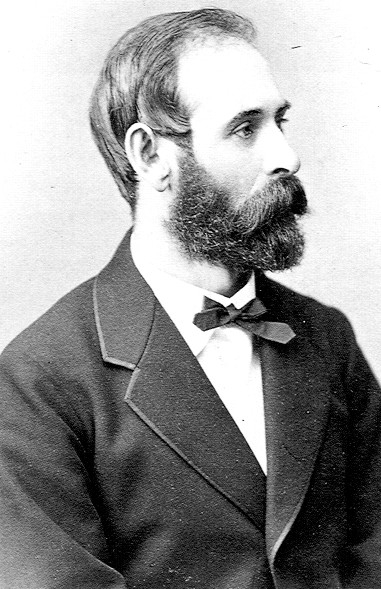
Pedro León Gallo Goyenechea

Pedro León Gallo Goyenechea (Copiapó, February 12, 1830 in Santiago – December 16, 1877) was a Chilean politician and one of the founders of the Radical Party. He was the son of the illustrious mining entrepreneur Miguel Gallo Vergara. He became involved in politics at an early age and took part in the street fighting of April 1851, defending the government against the rebels. However, as the decade progressed, Gallo turned against Manuel Montt. During the Revolution of 1859, Gallo's army of over 2,000 men were defeated by the loyalists. Exiled to Argentina, and later to the United States and Europe, following the failed 1859 rebellion, he returned in 1863 and served in the Chamber of Deputies beginning in 1867. In 1876, the year before his death, he was elected to the Chilean Senate.

He was the subject of Mario Bahamonde's book El caudillo de Copiapó.
