= Atacama Province =

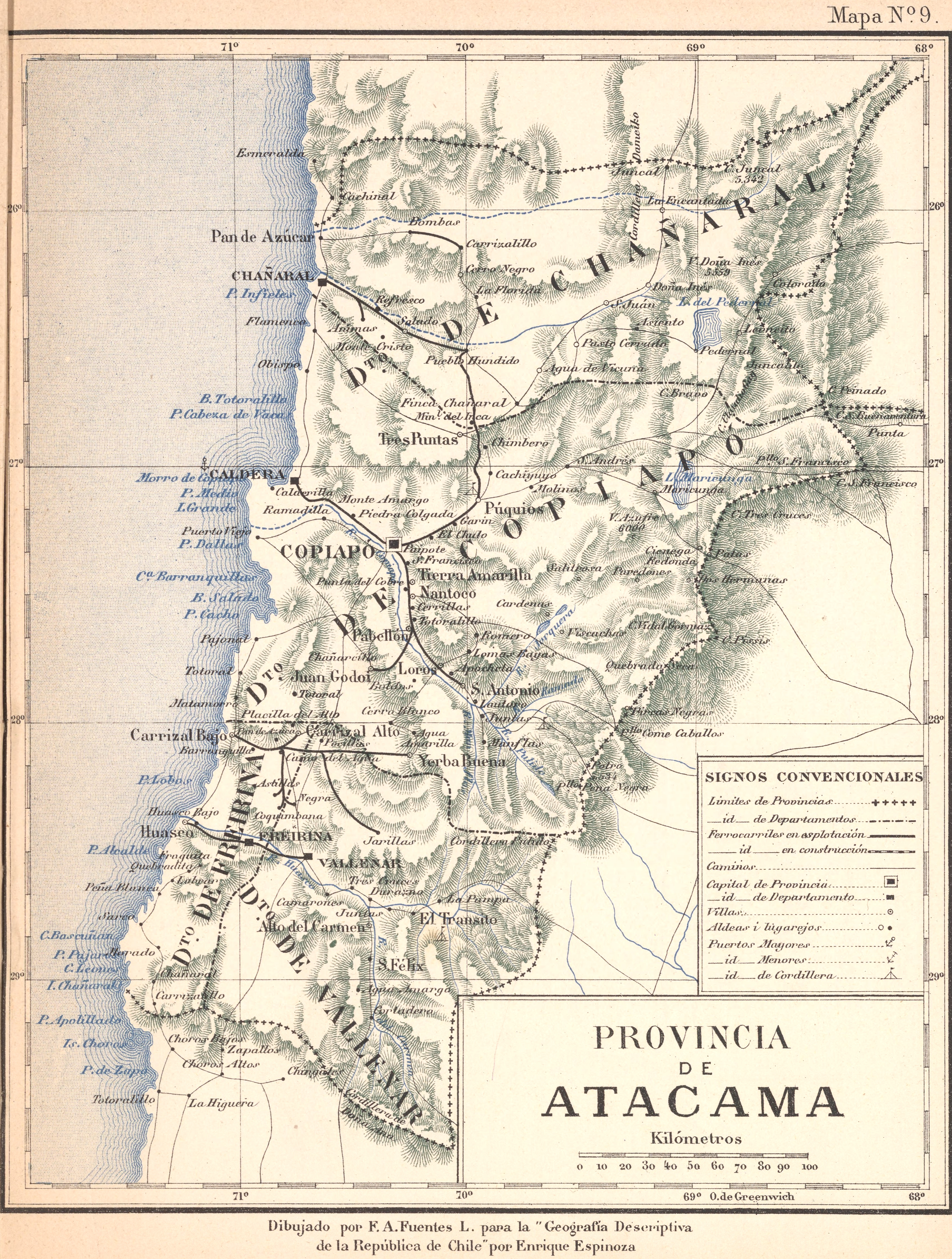
The province c. 1895

Atacama Province (Spanish: Provinicia de Atacama) was one of the administrative divisions of Chile from 1843 to 1976. The capital was Copiapó.

It was established on 31 October 1843 with its territory being carved out of the Province of Coquimbo. It was created as consequence of the Chilean silver rush that begun in 1832 in Chañarcillo. The initial departments were Copiapó, Freirina, Vallenar. It was disestablished in 1976, becoming a part of the Atacama Region.
