= Chilean Civil War =

Chilean Civil War may refer to:

- Chilean Civil War of 1829–1830
- 1851 Chilean revolution
- 1859 Chilean revolution
- Chilean Civil War of 1891
- 1973 Chilean coup d'état
