= Chilean independence debt =

The Chilean independence debt (Spanish: Deuda de Independencia de Chile) was a debt obtained from a large loan the nascent republic of Chile obtained in the last years of its independence war. The loan was obtained in London in 1822 by the government of Bernardo O'Higgins. To address the debt Minister of Finance Manuel Rengifo made first a study to identify all debts incurred before 1830. Chilean agent Francisco Javier Rosales was sent to London to negotiate the payments of the debt in 1836. He was however unable to reach an agreement with the creditors.

In parallel with the independence debt the Chilean government obtained in 1825 a loan from copper mining businessman Charles Saint Lambert who had settled in Chile. This loan allowed to finance the invasion of Chiloé Archipelago, a Chilean territory still held by royalists.

Exports of Chilean silver alongside copper and wheat were instrumental to help Chile prevent default in the 1830s and 1840s. Joaquín Tocornal who succeeded Rengifo as Minister of Finance paid off all the default and refused at the time to take new loans.

== See also ==
- Haitian independence debt
