= Chilean silver rush =

Silver rush in Chile (1830–1850)

Chilean Silver Rush
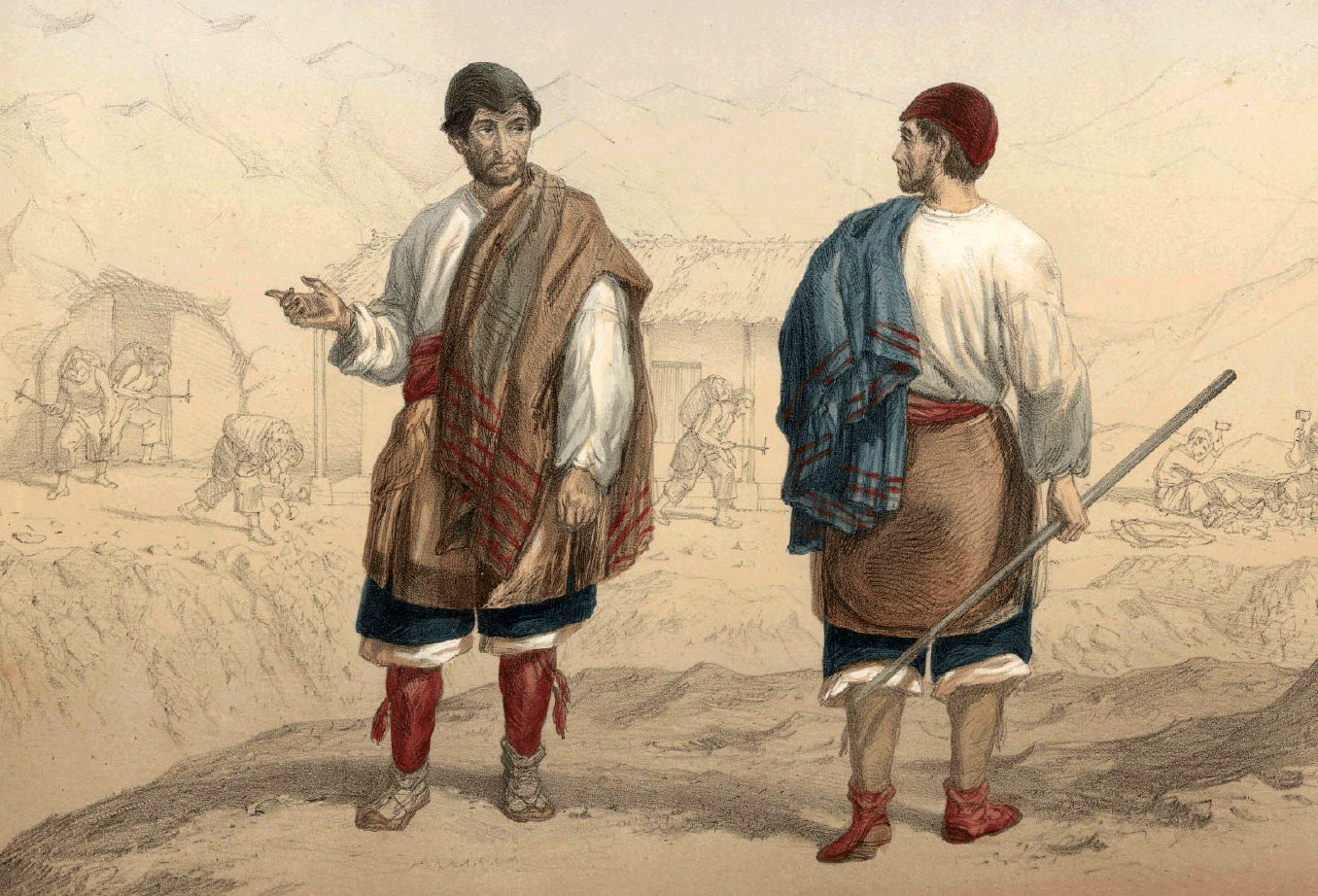
- Drawing of early 19th-century Chilean silver miners
- Date: 1830–1850
- Location: Norte Chico Mountains, Chile
- Cause: Major discoveries of silver in Chañarcillo in 1832 and Tres Puntas in 1848
- Participants: Chilean miners
- Outcome: Influx of silver miners led to the rapid demographic, infrastructural, and economic expansion of mining and non-mining industries in the Norte Chico mountain region of Chile

Between 1830 and 1850, Chilean silver mining grew at an unprecedented pace which transformed mining into one of the country's principal sources of wealth. The rush caused rapid demographic, infrastructural, and economic expansion in the semi-arid Norte Chico mountains where the silver deposits lay. A number of Chileans made large fortunes in the rush and made investments in other areas of the economy of Chile. By the 1850s, the rush was in decline and lucrative silver mining definitively ended in the 1870s. At the same time, mining activity in Chile reoriented to saltpetre operations.

Exports of Chilean silver alongside copper and wheat were instrumental in helping Chile to prevent default on its independence debt in London.

== Background ==
Placer deposits of gold were exploited by the Spanish in the 16th century following their arrival in the same century. However, only after the independence in the 19th century did mining once again get prominence among economic activities in Chile. Following the discovery of silver at Agua Amarga (1811) and Arqueros (1825), the Norte Chico mountains north of La Serena were intensely prospected. Indigenous peoples settled in the pueblos de indios of Norte Chico are believed to have withheld their knowledge of mineral deposits in the view that any hint of knowledge could lead to intense pressures or, reportedly, even torture. While there were some valuable ores neighbouring areas of Argentina that attracted Chilean miners it was in common parlance that ores were to be found on western side of the Andes and not to the east.

Stimulating the belief in the mining potential of northern Chile was a folk literature of oral geography made up of a series of descriptions of land routes leading to valuable outcrops known as derroteros and akin to the nautical rutter or the Roman Itinerarium. Among the most famous derroteros of the early 19th century was that indicating the way to the supposed discoveries of The Aragonese, two renowned independence-era prospectors. Some derroteros had vague descriptions of places, distorted information or even places that appear to be made up. Further, some led to legendary treasures such as tesoro del Inca. Over-all the derroteros are not known to have produced any significant mining discovery.

== Growth cycle ==
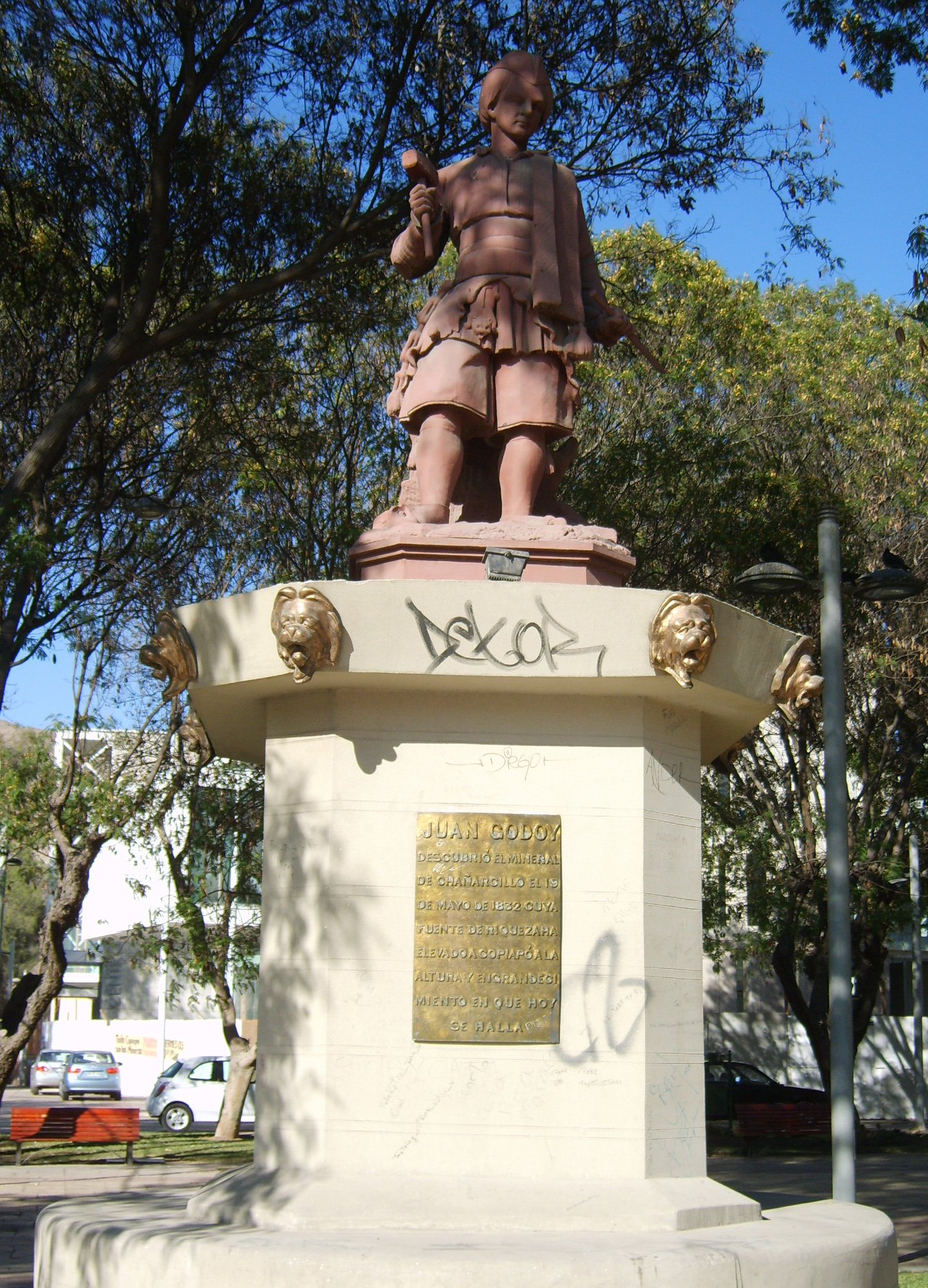
Statue of Juan Godoy with costumery miner clothes and tools in Copiapó. This statue was ordered in 1850 to be made in Birmingham. Contrary to popular belief, the face is not based on that of a Scottish man but on an Argentine arriero held by contemporaries to have had factions similar to Godoy.

Location of Chañarcillo and Tres Puntas and the cities of northern Chile as of 1830. Modern boundaries of Chile are shown.

On May 16, 1832, prospector Juan Godoy found a silver outcrop (reventón) 50 km south of Copiapó in the town of Chañarcillo. There are various tales and local sayings explaining the discovery by Godoy; one states that he found it while hunting for guanacos, while another saying holds that the outcrop was revealed to Godoy by his mother Flora Normilla on her deathbed. A third story claims that Godoy was guided to the riches of Chañarcillo by an alicanto, an animal pertaining to Chilean mythology. Godoy successfully claimed the discovered outcrop inscribing a third of the rights for his brother José Godoy and a third for local businessman Miguel Gallo. Godoy and his associates inscribed the claim as La Descubridora (lit. The Discovery). When the three men departed for the site on May 17, they were followed on the sly by local miners. On top of a hill next to Godoy's discovery, these men discovered the silver outcrop that was later known as El Manto de Los Peralta. On May 26, Gallo bought all the rights from the Godoy brothers for a small fortune which however came to dwindle in relation to the future earnings from mining.

The finding attracted thousands of people to the place and generated significant wealth. Besides Chileans, people from Argentina, Bolivia, and Peru arrived to work in Chañarcillo. During the heyday of Chañarcillo, it produced more than 332 tons of silver ore until the deposits began to be exhausted in 1874. A settlement of 600 people mushroomed in Chañarcillo leading to the establishment of a surveillance system to avoid disorders and theft of ore. Alcohol, knives, and women were banned from Chañarcillo. The settlement evolved over time to a town which was named Pueblo de Juan Godoy in 1846. Pueblo Juan Godoy came to have a plaza, school, market, hospital, theater, a railroad station, a church, and graveyard.

Following the discovery of Chañarcillo, many other ores were found near Copiapó well into the 1840s, as attested by numerous claims (denuncios) registered at the court of Copiapó. In 1848, another major ore deposit was discovered at Tres Puntas, sparking yet another rush. Copiapó experienced a large demographic shift and urban growth during the rush. It became the centre for trade and services of a large mining district. In 1851, Copiapó was connected by railroad to Caldera, its principal port of export. This was the first railroad to be established in Chile and the third one in South America. The increased importance of the area around Copiapó in national affairs led to the splintering of the northern Coquimbo Province to form the Atacama Province on October 31, 1843. In 1857, a school of mines was established in Copiapó.

Silver mining attracted many foreigners as attested in a 1854 census that showed that in the Province of Atacama lived 6887 foreignerners of which 83% were from Argentina and 9% were British. (Note: The 1875 showed that in the Province of Atacama lived 3262 foreign men and 1796 foreign women. Among the men about 83% were from Argentina and among the foreign women 95% were from Argentina.) Much cattle was brought to Atacama Province from Argentina to be sold for their meat during this period.

The mining zone grew slowly northwards into the diffuse border with Bolivia. Agriculture in Norte Chico and Central Chile also expanded as a consequence of the rush as it created a new market for its product.

In the 19th century, Claudio Gay and Benjamín Vicuña Mackenna were among the first to raise the question of the deforestation of Norte Chico caused by the firewood demands of the mining activity. Despite the reality of the degradation caused by mining, and contrary to popular belief, the Norte Chico forests were not pristine before the onset of mining in the 18th century.

== Chañarcillo ==
The mines of Chañarcillo were:

- La Descubridora
- Manto de Valdés
- Bolaco
- Colorada
- Las Guías
- El Reventón Colorado
- Mantos de Bolados
- Mina Yungay
- Mantos de Ossa
- Mantos de Peralta
- Constancia
- Candelaria
- Delirio
- Merceditas
- San Francisco
- Dolores 1
- Dolores 2

When it rains everybody gets wet, but in Atacama they get wet in silver

— Benjamín Vicuña Mackenna

== Aftermath ==
It has been noted that by 1855 Copiapó had already signs of decline. A 1869 prize for the finding of a new silver deposit issued by Copiapó's mining guild, Junta Minera, had no winners. In a mining congress held in Copiapó in 1874 the following proposals to address the decline were heard; the creation of a mining bank, petition for lowered fees for rail transport, the elaboration of report on the state of the mining industry aimed to attract foreign investment and the creation of mineral collection to present at the Chilean International Exhibition of 1875.

At the end of the silver rush, rich miners had diversified their assets into banking, agriculture, trade and commerce all over Chile. An example of this is silver mining magnate Matías Cousiño who initiated coal mining operations in Lota in 1852 rapidly transforming the town, from being a sparsely populated frontier zone in the mid-19th century, into a large industrial hub. Copper mining also benefited from the rush as it benefited from the ports and railways infrastructure built for silver mining.

In 1870, 1,570 miners worked in the Chañarcillo mines; however, the mines were exhausted by 1874, and mining largely ended in 1888 after the mines were accidentally flooded. Despite this, Chañarcillo was the most productive mining district in 19th century Chile.

A last major discovery of silver occurred 1870 (Note: According to Oreste Plath "some old miners believe that" Caracoles was discovered much earlier, presumably in 1811, by two Aragonese men who were escaping persecution during the independende era. Subsequently, the location of the outcrop is said to have been forgotten.) in Caracoles in Bolivian territory adjacent to Chile. Apart from being discovered by Chileans, the ore was also extracted with Chilean capital and miners. A copper mining boom that took of in Chile while the silver rush was ongoing lasted until the mid-1870s but by 1883, when the National Mining Society was established, mining of gold, silver and copper were in decline.

== See also ==
- Chileans in the California gold rush
- Chilean wheat cycle
- Guano Era
- Mate coquimbano
- Pirquinero
- Tierra del Fuego gold rush
