= Chileans in the California gold rush =

Chilean gold miners in California from 1848 to 1855

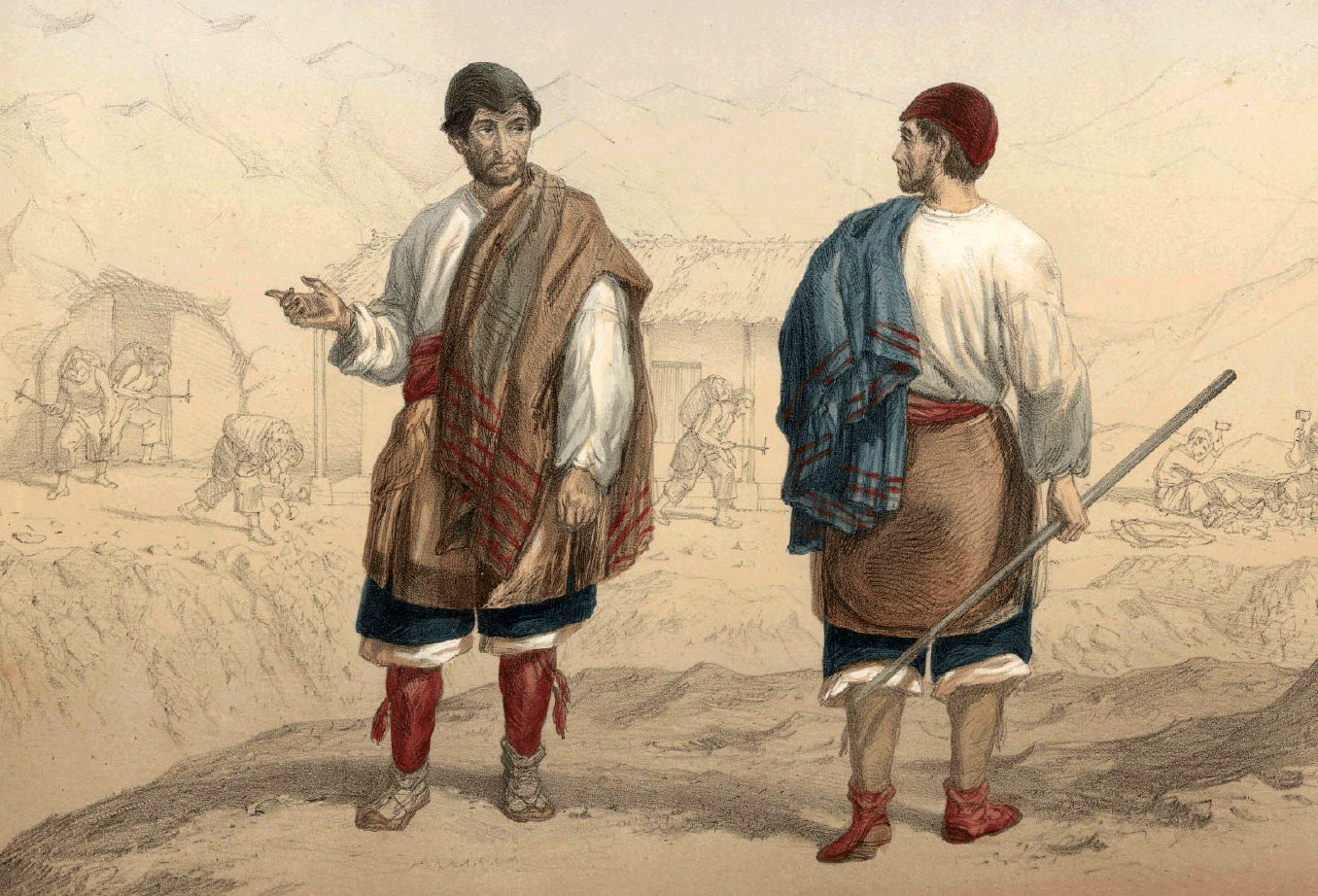
Drawing of an early 19th-century Chilean miner.

Chilean miners, merchants and adventurers were among the first to respond to the California gold rush with the first group arriving by sea in 1848. News about the rush arrived in Valparaíso in September 1848 and the first group of Chileans arrived in California in late October of the same year. 1500 Chileans arrived in San Francisco in 1848. In total, Chile issued about 6,000 passports for travellers to California, but this does not reflect the number of migrants as many abandoned the country informally and Chile found little use in attempting to regulate and register the emigrants.

Chileans came from central Chile, and were –except the very first wave– often skilled miners –as opposed to the bulk of the arrivals to California. This made Chileans relatively well-prepared for mining influencing practises in California by –among other things– introducing the mining technology to California such as the batea gold pan, then made of wood, and the trapiche which became known as the Chilean mill. Many Euroamericans were indebted to Chileans who taught them the basics of the mining trade.

In contrast to Anglo-Americans, Chileans tended to work less individually and more cooperatively, something that facilitated certain types of mining endeavours. (Note: An example of cooperative mining is given by Leonard Kip who in 1849 observed more than 100 Chilean and Mexican miners build a dam to dry a stream bed to mine its gold-bearing sands.) (Note: Another difference noted by the merchant Vicente Pérez Rosales was that Chileans preferd to buy quality items while Euroamericans usually went for cheaper and lower quality items despite having resources enough to buy those of high quality.) Over-all, Chileans were initially more successful than Euroamerican miners causing a negative campaign against them in the press. A Chilean practise that was much resented was for Chilean companies to make claims in the names of their "peons", something Euroamericans equated with using slaves to make claims. In some accounts, the success of Chileans miners was exaggerated to make the claim large amounts of gold was being shipped out to Chile. Success among Chileans in California was not universal and some returned early on due to financial failure. Estimates of the numbers of Chileans in California goes as high as 7,000, but the 1850 California census reported only 619 Chileans, likely due to Chileans hiding their identity. A large number of Chileans returned to Chile after the 1849–1850 period.

In California, the term Chilean garnered a wider meaning often including any Spanish-speaking non-European nationality and usually associated with a "bronze-coloured" skin tone. Many Mexicans and Peruvians were branded "Chilean". Reportedly this branding was due to Chilean's high visibility given their tendency to assume leadership in groups of Spanish-speaking immigrants.

Among the Chileans who embarked to California was Vicente Pérez Rosales who wrote extensively about it contrasting aspects of the North American society with the Chilean one. The Californian writings of Pérez Rosales were published in various forms having a lasting impact in discourses about Chilean identity. (Note: The experience of Pérez Rosales in California was useful in his assignment in 1850 as organizer of the Chilean state-sponsored immigration scheme for Germans to colonize southern Chile.) The extent of emigration caused concern about a purported shortage of skilled labour in Chile and the issue was discussed in the Congress of Chile. The emigration of Chileans to California happened at the same time as trade relations between Chile and California greatly expanded with Chile supplying California with large amounts of wheat.

A large number of Chilean women worked as prostitutes in Little Chile during the rush, (Note: "in the spring of 1849, Chilecito housed fifteen white women and nearly 300 Chilena women of whom two-thirds were harlots from Mexico, Peru, and Chile".) and many of them were from Valparaíso.

== Conflicts and discrimination ==
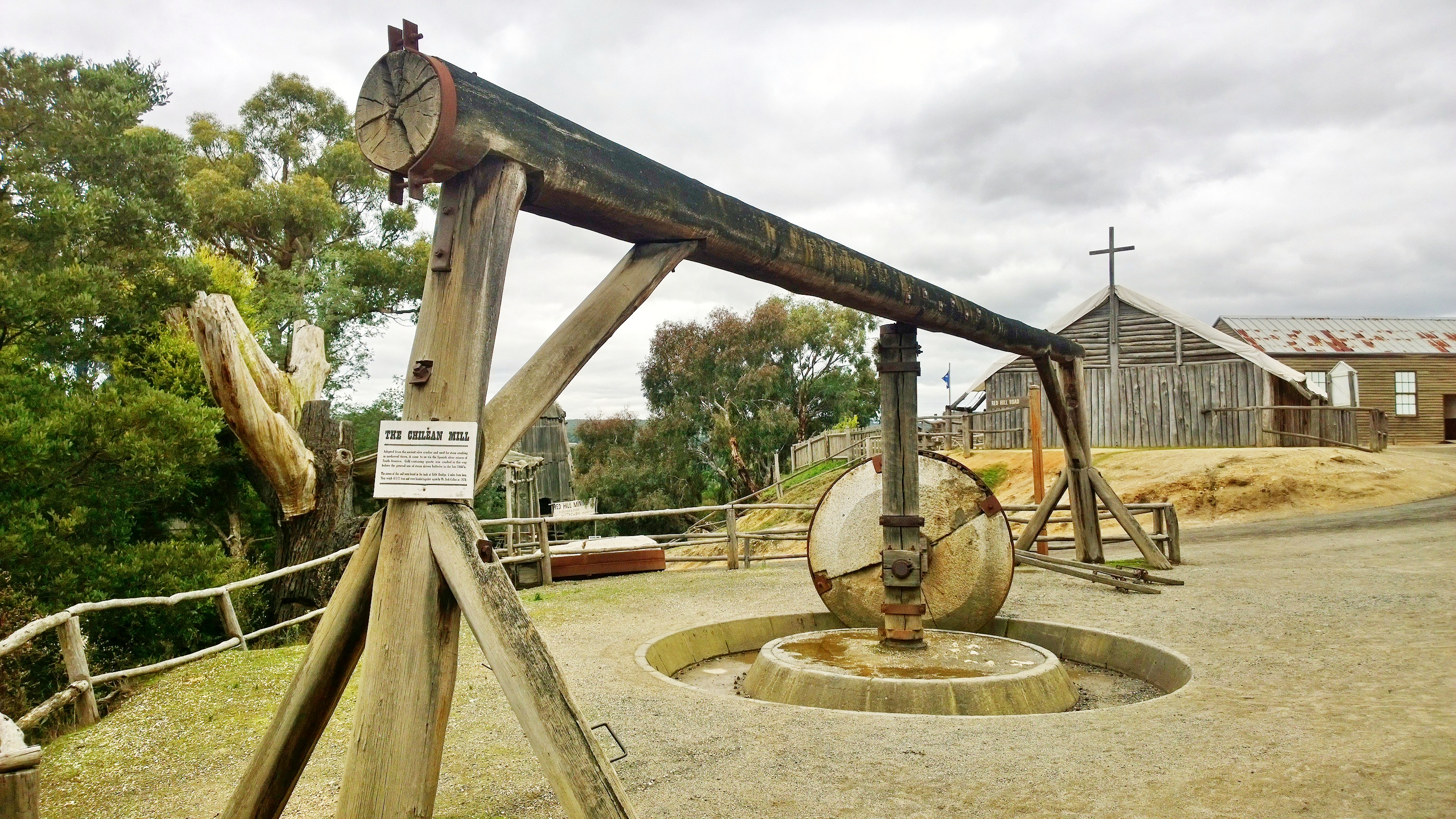
Replica of a horse-powered Chilean mill which Chileans introduced to California during the gold rush.

After the initial boom had ended Chileans were among the groups that suffered explicitly anti-foreign and racist attacks, laws and confiscatory taxes sought to drive out foreigners—in addition to Native Americans—from the mines. There are records of Chileans resisting this treatment both by legal means and by the use of violence. Spanish-speaking miners, including Peruvians and Mexicans tended to group together and commonly Chileans took leadership in these groups, specially when they had to confront groups of Anglo-American miners. Prior to these incidents Chileans were unaware of the racial worldview of Anglo-Americans, some were surprised to discover they were seen as non-white.

=== Attack on San Francisco's Little Chile ===
Little Chile (Spanish: Chilecito) was a neighborbood where many Chileans settled in San Francisco. Many dwellings there were tents and various of the Chilean women there were prostitutes. The neighbourhood was attacked by The Hounds gang in July 15, 1849. Many dwellings were sacked and torched and victims were ethnically targeted as exemplified by an Englishman who was spared from violence due to his nationality. By one account this attack originated in a conflict between the leader of The Hounds, Sam Roberts, and his Chilean mistress, another account mention a debt recovery dispute of 500 dollars from a man known Pedro Cueta from Jorge Frank prior to the attack. Roberts went unpunished despite being found guilty in trial. These events led to creation of the San Francisco Police Department and of a Chilean consulate in San Francisco within one month after the attack. It was the last attack of The Hounds gang.

It was after the losses suffered in this attack that Chilean merchant Vicente Pérez Rosales decided to depart California for his native Chile.

=== "Chile War of 1849" ===
On December 15, 1849, Anglo-Americans sacked the mining camp of Chileans near Calaveras River. Chileans went to the town of Stockton and obtained permits to arrest those responsible by local authorities. Calaveras judge Scollen refrained from supporting the arrest warrant citing that American law does not allow foreigners to arrest American citizens. A group of about eighty Chileans went nonetheless to the Anglo-American camp and attacked it taking 16 captives and killed two in the process. On the way to Stockton other Anglo-Americans rescued the captives and captured the Chileans instead. After being found guilty of the attacks by a jury, Chileans faced punishment in Mokelumne Hill in January 1850. Three were executed, nine received 100 lashes each and one was cropped. The severity of these punishments stand out as corporal punishment was otherwise declining in the Western world.

== Later developments ==
The location of San Francisco and Valparaíso which were the main ports used for the emigration of Chileans to California. The map shows also important ports in Australia and New Zealand near gold districts to which Chileans migrated after the California gold rush. Modern boundaries are shown in the map.

Many Chileans left following implementation of taxes on foreign miners in 1850. Some left for Chile and other for the Australian gold rushes that begun in 1851. In Australia Chilean miners came also to work in mines of silver and iron, and some Chileans left later Australia to join the gold rushes of New Zealand.

Strong anti-Chilean sentiment appear to have largely dissipated by 1851 or 1852. Discriminatory attitudes against Chileans remained and Chileans often formed solidarity groups with Mexicans. The poor treatment of Chileans contrasts with the more favourable treatment of other immigrant groups such as English, Germans, Irish and Cornish.

Some Chileans resisted the initial wave of attacks and hostile legislation and became established settlers opening new mines like Black Diamind Mine in 1856. Other Chileans were progressively marginalized, having to share ownership of their prospects with Anglo-Americans to remain in business and came over time to transform into unqualified labour. This contrast to Anglo Americans miners who tended to have more skilled employment using machinery. Many found their way as cheap labour in industrialized mines controlled by Anglo-Americans where they alongside Mexicans took the most dangerous and ill-paid jobs.

Many Chileans who stayed in California mixed by marriages with the Euroamerican population. It is speculated they were able to do this more easily than Mexicans due to Chileans commonly having a somewhat lighter skin-tone than the bulk of the Mexicans, thus being more accepted in a racist society.

== See also ==
- Chileno Creek
- Chilean silver rush (1832–1850)
- Second Chilean wheat cycle (1849–1880)
- Chili Gulch
- Chinese in the California gold rush
- Joaquin Murrieta
- Tierra del Fuego gold rush (1883–1906)

== Bibliography ==
- Brands, H. W. (2002). The Age of Gold: The California Gold Rush and the New American Dream. New York: Anchor Books. ISBN 0-385-50216-8.
- Faragher, John Mack (2006). Out of Many: A History of the American People (5th ed.). Pearson. p. 411.
- Johnson, Susan Lee (2001). Roaring Camp: The Social World of the California Gold Rush. New York: W. W. Norton & Company. ISBN 978-0-393-32099-2.
- Starr, Kevin; Orsi, Richard J., eds. (2000). Rooted in Barbarous Soil: People, Culture, and Community in Gold Rush California. Berkeley and Los Angeles: University of California Press. ISBN 978-0-520-22496-4.
