= Oriel Álvarez Gómez =

Chilean historian

Oriel Álvarez Gómez (Vallenar, November 20, 1923 – Copiapó, January 31 2009) was a Chilean historian and miner. He has been described as "the most important historian of Atacama Region in the late 20th and early 21st century". Among his works Atacama de plata (lit. Atacama of Silver), which deals with the 19th-century Chilean silver rush, has been acclaimed. In 1995 Álvares published a second work on the history of mining named Huasco de cobre. Álvarez contributed to the history of the city of Petorca, publishing a book about it in 1998 and establishing its until-then-unknown date of founding. Álvarez had a short stint as an elected official—regidor in Freirina—from 1960 to 1961. He was a member of the Academia Chilena de la Lengua.
