= Bahamondes =

Bahamondes is a surname. Notable people with the surname include:

- Alberto Bahamondes, Chilean politician
- Francisco Bahamondes (born 1988), Chilean football left back
- Ignacio Bahamondes (born 1997), Chilean mixed martial artist
- Ramón Silva Bahamondes, Chilean singer

== See also ==
- Bahamonde, middle name and surname
