= Bahamonde =

Bahamonde is a surname. Notable people with the surname include:

== Surname ==
- Alejo Lascano Bahamonde, Ecuadorian surgeon, educator, and philanthropist
- Ángel Bahamonde Magro, Spanish historian
- Anselmo de la Cruz y Bahamonde, Chilean politician
- Braulio Bahamonde, Chilean minister
- Carlos Ruiz Bahamonde, Chilean minister
- Enrique Bahamonde, Chilean lawyer and politician
- Francisco Bahamonde de Lugo, former governor of Puerto Rico and of Cartagena de Indias
- Francisco Franco Bahamonde (1892–1975), former dictator of Spain
- Marco Bahamonde (born 1980), Chilean football midfielder
- Mario Bahamonde, Chilean writer and teacher
- Nicolás Franco Bahamonde, Spanish naval officer and politician
- Ramón Franco Bahamonde, Spanish aviation pioneer and politician
- Ruperto Bahamonde, Chilean politician
- Yamilé Bahamonde (born 1987), Ecuadorian swimmer

== See also ==
- Bahamonde's beaked whale, rare species of beaked whale in the South Pacific Ocean
- Bahamonde Point, point on the Schmidt Peninsula in Graham Land, Antarctica
- Bahamondes, a surname
