= Jordan Springs =

Jordan Springs may refer to:

- Jordan Hot Springs, California, United States
- Jordan Springs, New South Wales, Australia
- Jordan Springs, Virginia, United States
