= Miguel Gallo =

Chilean politician (1793–1853)

Miguel Gallo Vergara (La Serena, 1793 - Chañarcillo, March 8, 1853) was a Chilean millionaire mining entrepreneur, politician and patriot. He was mayor of Copiapó for the year 1820, and was appointed a Deputy of the Republic of Chile representing Copiapó, Chañaral and Freirina from 1849 to 1852. A pioneer of the silver mining industry in Chile, working with Juan Godoy from 1832, he is still remembered as an illustrious figure in the Atacama mining industry and in the history of Copiapó.

== Early life and patriotism ==
He was born in La Serena, the son of José Antonio Gallo y Rocalandro, a distinguished gentleman and radical of the 18th century, who was born in Viareggio, Italy. His father died in 1818 at the age of 90.

Gallo Vergara was appointed Lieutenant-Governor of La Serena on February 15, 1817. He played a role in securing the independence of Chile, and was appointed to the board of judges for the territorial districts of the new country. He was initially involved with regulating municipal revenues and making improvements to infrastructure. He resigned from this position on November 19, 1818, having fulfilled his duty as a patriot.

== Entrepreneurship and death ==
Gallo Vergara sought to become an entrepreneur. He founded the copper mining company Injenio del Molle, which commenced mining operations in the Sierra de Chañarcillo. Working with Juan Godoy, he was notable figure in the silver mining industry in Chile which took off in 1832. Gallo Vergara was later involved in the wine industry, producing the most exquisite Atacama wines of the period.

Miguel Gallo Vergara died suddenly in the town of Chañarcillo on March 8, 1853, leaving his vast fortune to his family. He was survived by his wife Candelaria Goyenechea Sierra and sons Pedro León Gallo Goyenechea, Ángel Gallo Goyenechea and Tomás Gallo Goyenechea. Most sources claim March 8, 1842 as the date of his death, but he was known to have served as a Deputy of the Republic representing Copiapó, Chañaral and Freirina from 1849 to 1852 as he succeeded Juan José Aldunate Larraín and was succeeded by José Francisco Gana Lópe. March 8, 1853 is now cited in genealogical records to be the accurate date of his death. He is still remembered as an illustrious figure in the Atacama mining industry and in the history of Copiapó.
