= Arqueros =

Coordinates: 29°50′S 70°56′W

Arqueros is a mining district in the Chilean Norte Chico region. It is located 7 km northwest of the Talcuna copper district. The discovery of silver at Arqueros in the 1830s led the Norte Chico mountains north of La Serena to be exhaustively prospected sparkling the Chilean silver rush in the 1830s and 1840s.

== See also ==
- Arqueros Formation
- Chañarcillo
- Tres Puntas
