= Matías Cousiño =

Chilean coal magnate (1810–1863)

Matías Cousiño Jorquera
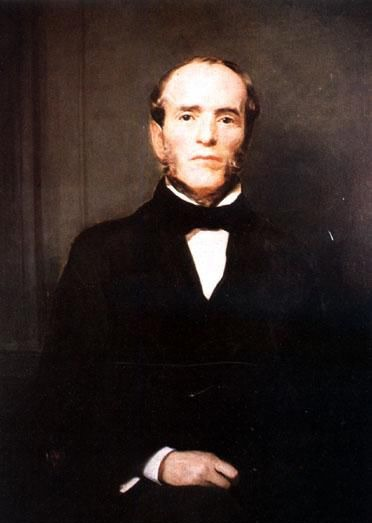
- Born: 1810; Santiago, Chile
- Died: March 21, 1863 (aged 52–53); Santiago, Chile

Matías Cousiño Jorquera (1810–1863) was a Chilean coal magnate and patriarch of the wealthy Cousiño family. Cousiño's most emblematic coal mine was found in Lota a small coastal town on the coast of the Bío-Bío Region, where steam ships that crossed the Strait of Magellan could be resupplied with coal.

== Early and personal life ==
Matías Cousiño was born in Santiago, Chile as the son of José Agustín Cousiño Zapata and Josefa de Jorquera y Alfaro, a family of Galician and Spanish descent. During the War for Independence, his family lost their wealth, and Matías was forced to work at an early age. He worked in the post office of Valparaíso, where his father was the boss. He went on to succeed his father in 1828. During this time, he married Loreto Squella y Lopetegui, who died giving birth to his first son, Luis Cousiño Squella. Matías Cousiño studied in Santiago without excelling in his academics, but doing so in business.

In 1841, he married Luz Gallo Zavala, who had 2 children. Thanks to his economic power, he was elected to the Chamber of Deputies, representing the Petorca (1849–1852) and Quillota (1852–1855). He was elected senator between 1855 and 1864 but died on March 21, 1863, in Santiago.

== Birth of the entrepreneur ==
He quit his work at the post office to begin exporting animals to Argentina, and the success of this business led him to search for new ventures, one being the new silver mines in Copiapó. At the end of the 1840s, he expanded into the milling industry in Concepción. He organized a milling association that exported flour and wheat to the Pacific coast.

His mining career began as a butler in the mines of Ramón Ignacio de Goyenechea, an investor in the silver mine of Descubridora de Chañarcillo in the Atacama Desert. He continued ascending in position until his marriage in 1841, widow of Ignacio de Goyenechea, allowed him to combine the two fortunes. His fortune continued to grow when in 1844, along with Rafael Torreblanca, he invented a new machine to extract metals. He obtained an exclusive permit for its use from Manuel Bulnes' government for ten years.

In 1850, Matías became director of The Copiapó Mining Group, the most powerful association in Chile.
