= Institute of Chile =

- Instituto de Chile
- Emblem of the Institute of Chile. The Latin motto translates as "Joined by the bond of humanity".

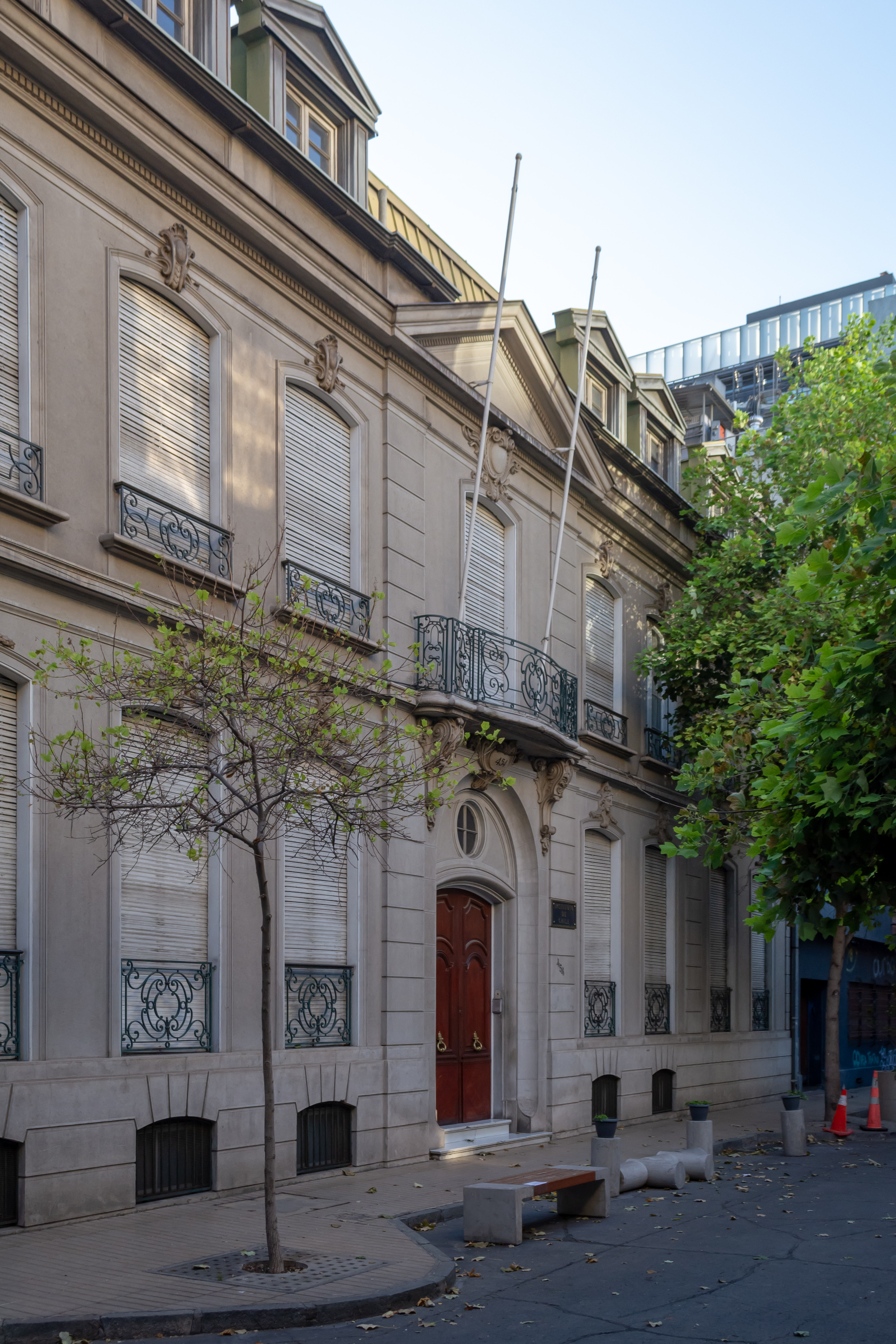
- Headquarters in Santiago
- Formation: 30 September 1964; 62 years ago
- Founder: Jorge Alessandri Rodríguez
- Founded at: Santiago, Chile
- Headquarters: Almirante Montt 454
- Coordinates: 33.437°S 70.644°W
- President: Sergio Lavandero (2025–2027)
- Website: www.institutodechile.cl

The Institute of Chile (Spanish: Instituto de Chile) is an umbrella institution that brings together that country's six national academies:

- Academia Chilena de la Lengua: language and literature
- Academia Chilena de la Historia: history
- Academia Chilena de Ciencias: sciences
- Academia Chilena de Medicina: medicine
- Academia Chilena de Ciencias Sociales, Políticas y Morales: social sciences, politics and ethics
- Academia Chilena de Bellas Artes: fine arts

It was created on 30 September 1964 under President Jorge Alessandri Rodríguez to promote the "cultivation, advancement and dissemination of literature, science and fine arts". To achieve that goal, it organises cultural, scientific and artistic events, conducts seminars, issues publications, organises competitions and awards scholarships.

It is managed by a board (consejo) comprising the presidents or directors of the six academies, together with two additional members from each. It liaises with the government through the Ministry of Education and its headquarters are located in central Santiago.

The president of the institute for the 2025–2027 term is the biochemist Sergio Lavandero, president of the Academy of Sciences.
