= Jordan Hot Springs =

Thermal spring

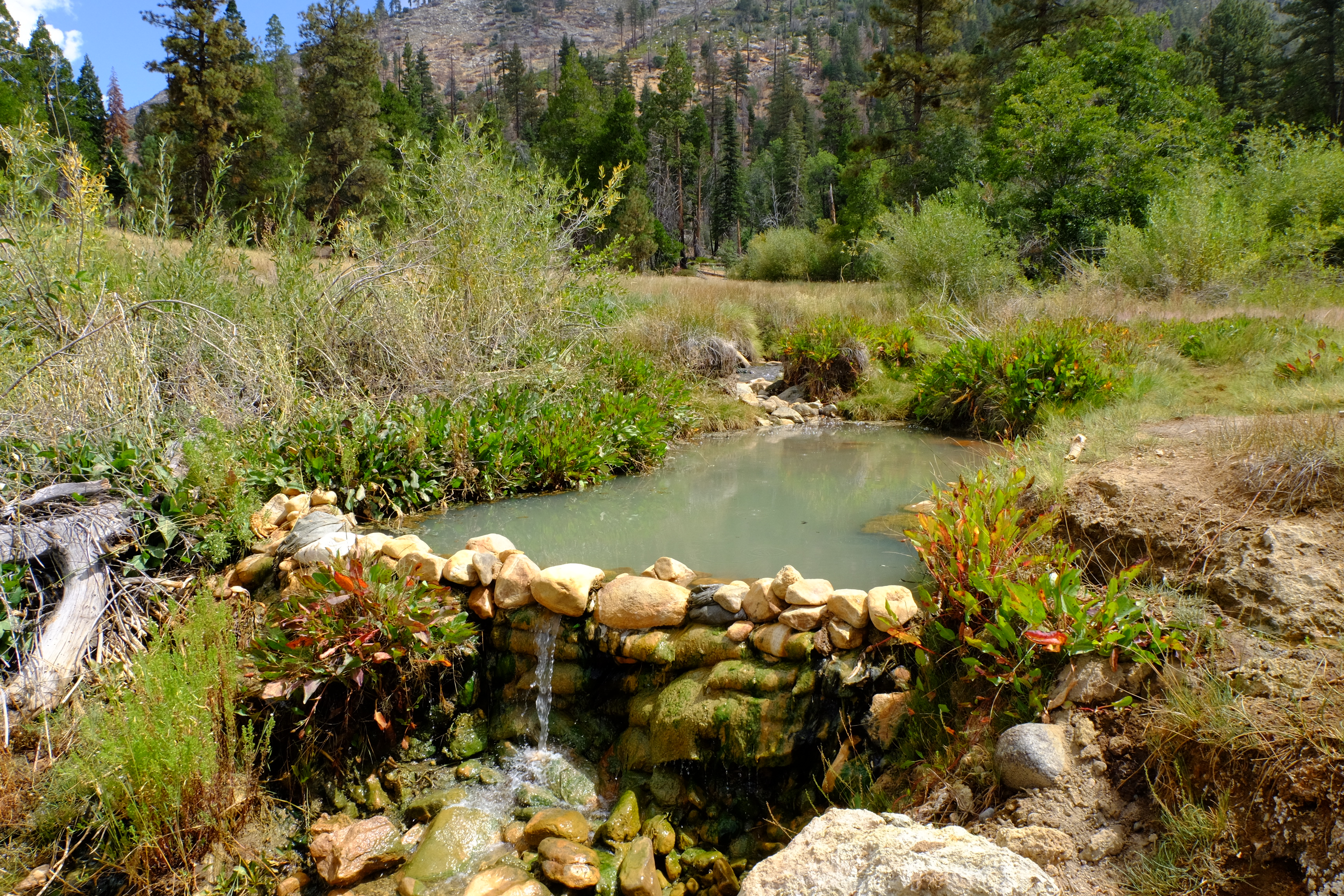
- Soaking Pool at Jordan Hot Springs
- Interactive map of Jordan Hot Springs
- Location: Northwest of the town of Little Lake, California
- Coordinates: 36°13′44″N 118°18′07″W
- Elevation: 6,500 ft (2,000 m)
- Type: geothermal
- Temperature: 120 °F (49 °C)

Jordan Hot Springs is series of thermal mineral springs located in the Golden Trout Wilderness, Inyo National Forest, California.

== History ==
Prior to European contact, the hot springs and the surrounding areas were used by the local Indigenous people for centuries as a summer encampment area. In 1857, John Jordan, a Texan, and his family moved to Tulare County during the gold and silver rush. Later, in 1861 he blazed a trail to the hot springs and filed a petition to build a toll road, called the Jordan Trail. The following year he drowned in the Kern River while navigating a raft across the river. In the late 19th century a grouping of log cabins and a logging camp was built.

In 1992, Jordan Hot Springs received National Historic Landmark status.

== Description ==
There are at least fourteen hot springs making up the Jordan Hot Springs system. Hot mineral water emerges from the springs at 120°F, and flows down to meet Nine Mile Creek where it cools and collects in a series of primitive rock-walled soaking pools of various temperatures. The average temperature of the water in the soaking pools is 104°F. The cooler soaking pools are 94°F. There is also a small, two-foot deep concrete-lined soaking pool.

The ruins of an abandoned early 20th century resort camp are nearby.

== Location ==
The spring can be reached by way of a trail originating at the Blackrock Station, the trail descends 3,000 feet during the six mile hike to the springs; the moderately rigorous return hike ascends 3,000 feet. GPS coordinates: N 36 13.740 W 118 18.120.

== See also ==
- List of hot springs in the United States
- List of hot springs in the world
