= Chilean mill =

Machine used in early gold mining

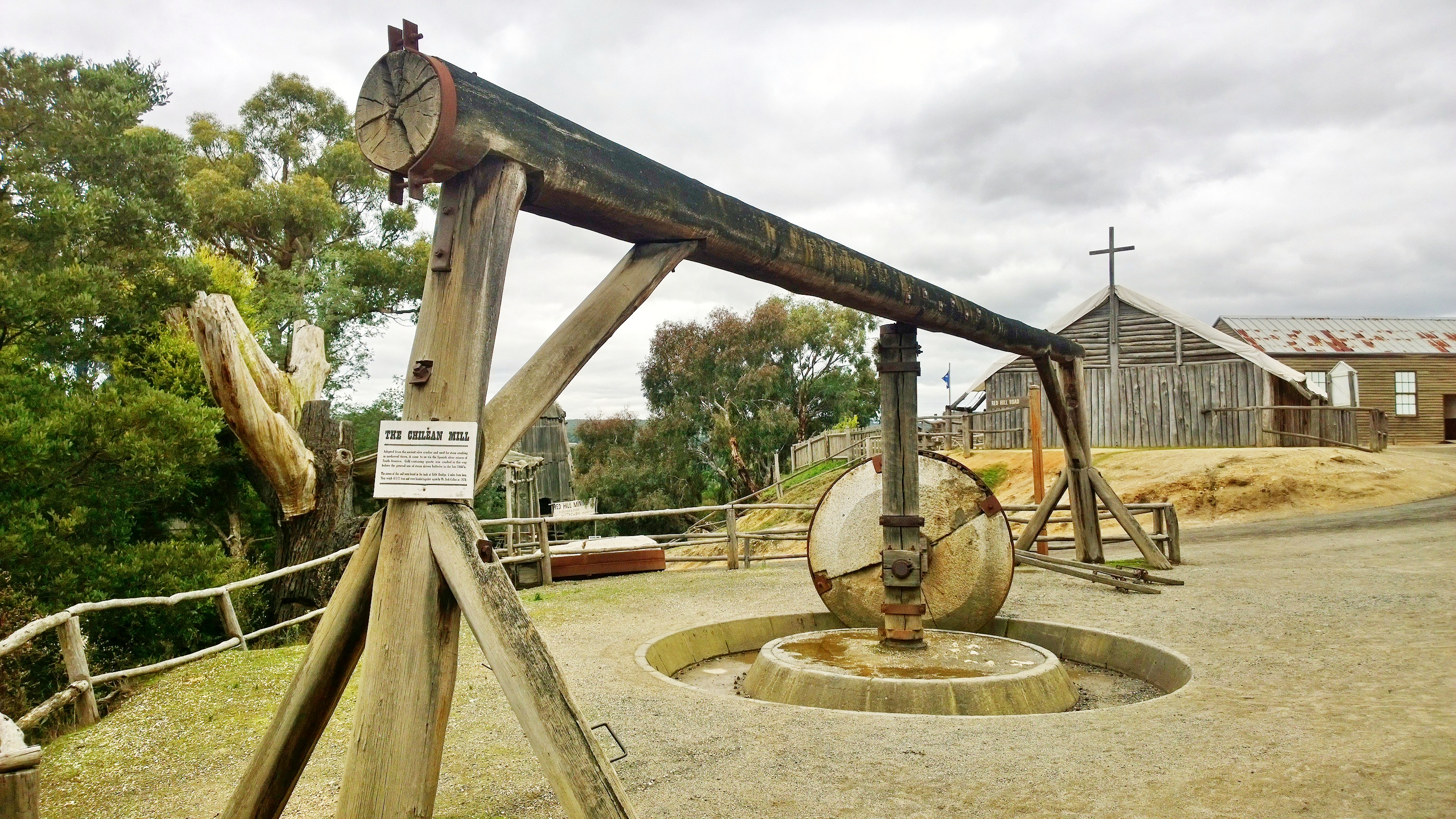
Replica horse-powered Chilean Mill at Sovereign Hill open-air museum in Ballarat

The Chilean mill is a machine used on gold fields, still used today in small-scale mining, it was more common in earlier period of gold mining. The machine was composed of two rotating wheels that would revolve over a pan filled with gold-bearing rocks. The idea was that the wheels would break open the rocks with gold, so they could harvest gold from multiple rocks at a time.

One of the earliest such machines was built in Ballarat in Victoria, Australia, during the Victorian gold rush and was combined with a sluice for extracting the gold. Another such machine in Australia was used, at the Fitzroy Iron Works, to grind clay for making fire bricks. The bricks were needed for repairing the many furnaces at the works.

The Chilean mill, known in Chile as a "trapiche", is still in use in artisanal gold mining in the Andes Mountains. In the process, the crushed rock passes over metal plates coated with mercury where the gold inclusions adhere to the mercury. The gold is recovered after the evaporation of the mercury over a fire. The mill sometimes has two wheels driven by a belt attached to a motor, or a single wheel driven by mules, oxen, or other pack animals. Working Chilean mills can still be seen in Andacollo, Chile, a mining district where artisanal miners known as pirquineros remain active.

== See also ==
- Chileans in the California gold rush
- Edge mill
- Gold mining in Chile
