= Caracoles =

Mining town in the Atacama desert

- Location within Antofagasta Region Location within Chile
- Location: Antofagasta Region, Chile; 23°2′19.42″S 69°0′20.33″W
- Products: Silver
- Opened: 1870

Caracoles was a silver mining district in what is now Antofagasta Region, Chile. At the time of official discovery in 1870 the district was located in Bolivia. The silver ores of Caracoles were discovered on March 24, 1870, by a Chilean prospecting team led by José Díaz Gana that had departed from the port town of Antofagasta. Subsequently, the ores were extracted with Chilean capital and miners. It was the last major discovery of the Chilean silver rushes. According to Oreste Plath "some old miners believe that" Caracoles was discovered much earlier, presumably in 1811, by two Aragonese men who were escaping persecution during the independence era. However, the location of the outcrop is said to have been forgotten. The site of Caracoles evolved rapidly from a group of rudimentary shelters and huts in 1870 to a small hamlet in 1871. Afterwards the settlement continued to grow reaching a population of several thousand inhabitants.

Its precise location led to dispute between the Bolivian and the Chilean Governments because the Boundary Treaty of 1866 between Chile and Bolivia ordered that tax incomes from the region between the 23°S and the 25°S be divided in equal parts. Negotiations led to the Corral-Lindsay agreement, which was not ratified by Bolivia, but later both countries signed the Boundary Treaty of 1874 between Chile and Bolivia which eliminated the "Mutual Benefits Zone" between the 23°S and the 25°S parallels.

Mining in Caracoles begun to decline in the mid-1870s due to the exhaustion of the richest ores and declining international prices of silver. Caracoles' long distance to the ports in the coast did not help either to the economic situation.

After Chilean conquest in 1879 the town was declared head of Caracoles Department in Antofagasta Province. The settlements associated with the mines were largely depopulated and in ruins by the 1950s.

== Gallery ==
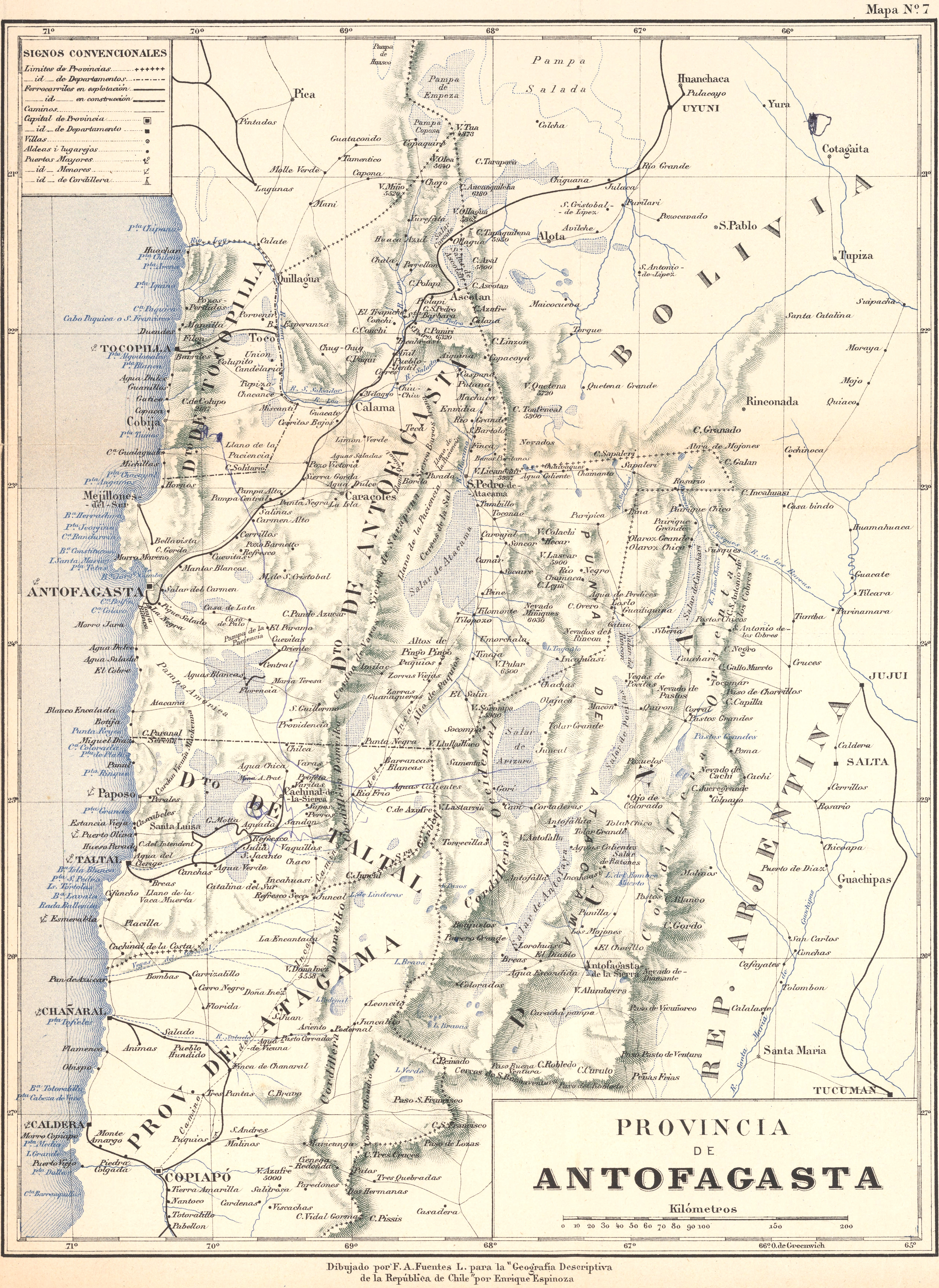
Map of Antofagasta Province in 1895. Caracoles is marked out east of Mejillones and south of Calama.

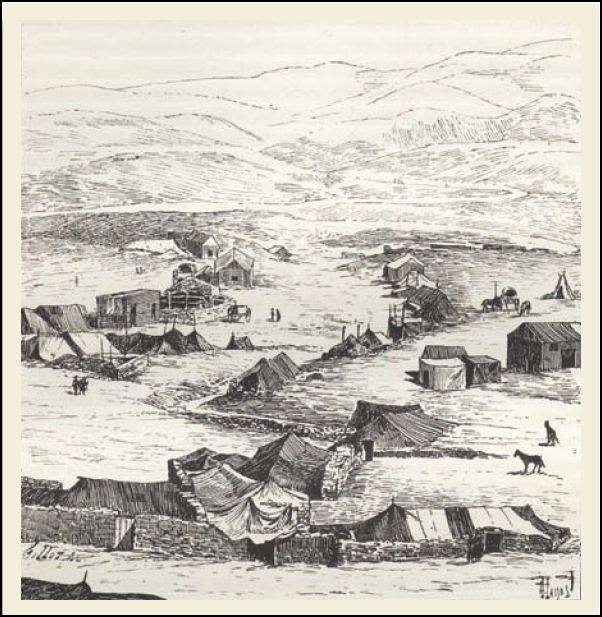
The burgeoning town of Caracoles in 1872.
