= Juan Godoy =

Chilean miner (1800–1842)

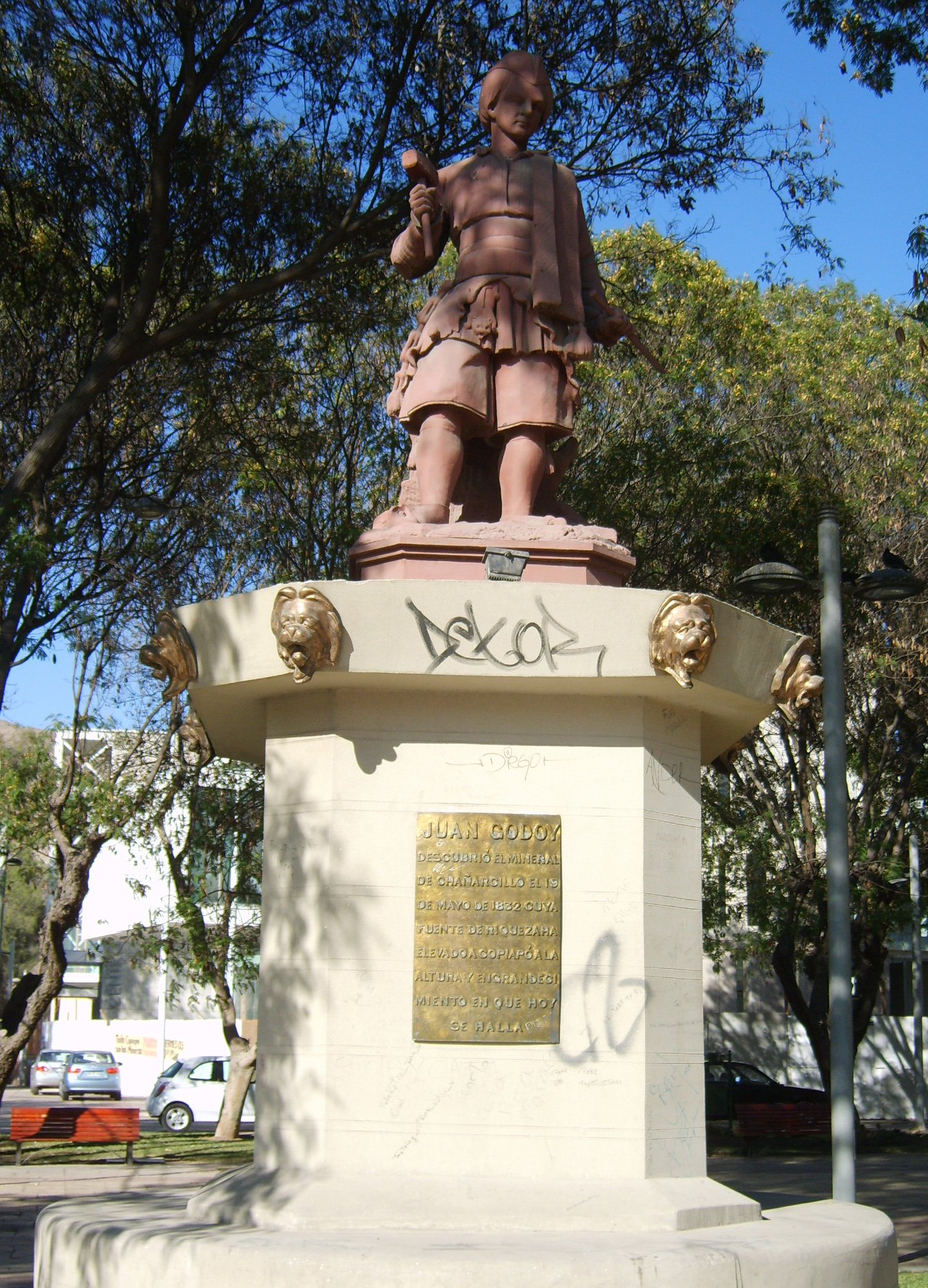
- Statue of Juan Godoy in Copiapó
- Born: Juan Godoy; 1800; San Fernando, near Copiapó, Captaincy General of Chile
- Died: 1842 (aged 41–42); La Serena, Chile
- Known for: Discovered silver ore in Chañarcillo, sparking the Chilean silver rush

Juan Godoy (1800 – 1842) was a Chilean farmer and miner who in 1832 discovered an outcrop (reventón) of silver 50 km (31 mi) south of Copiapó in Chañarcillo, sparking the Chilean silver rush.

== Biography ==
Godoy was born to Flora Normilla, an indigenous woman, in the reduction of San Fernando in 1800. Later, he was baptized in the town of Copiapó. Godoy is referred to in sources as a mestizo, implying his father was not indigenous. Unconfirmed rumours hold that Godoy's father was an Argentine arriero. His surname Godoy is a hispanization of Normilla. He worked variously as goatherd, arriero, and farmer with his mother but also as miner and woodcutter before the discovery of Chañarcillo. He had experience as apire in the mine of Puquios located inland from Copiapó. As independent miner he exploited the ores of El Algodón alongside his friend Celestino Varas, but this activity was barely profitable as at the point he arrived to El Algodón the mine was exhausted. Godoy was very likely illiterate.

Along with his mother and his younger brother José Godoy they lived near Chañarcillo in Punta Pajonales prior to his discovery of silver. There they gathered firewood that they sold at the copper smelters of Bandurrias and El Molle. Bandurrias was owned by Santiago José Meléndez and El Molle was owned by Miguel Gallo.

=== Discovery of silver at Chañarcillo ===
It is said that Godoy found the outcrop while hunting guanacos. Godoy was able to recognise the silver outcrop since he had previously worked in mining as explosives driller (barretero) and apire (apir). Another account holds that the outcrop was revealed to Godoy by his mother, Flora Normilla, on her deathbed. According to folklore, Godoy was guided to the riches of Chañarcillo by an alicanto, a bird pertaining to Chilean mythology.

He successfully claimed the associated mining rights for the silver outcrop for himself and his brother José Godoy. Notoriously, local business leader Miguel Gallo also appeared registered as owning a third of the claim from the beginning. Various explanations have been put forward to explain this. One is that Godoy included Gallo in the claim at the request of his mother Flora. The reason is said to have been that Flora had known about the silver outcrop and told Gallo many times about it without him bothering about finding out the truth of it. Following this saying Flora only told her son Juan about it on her death bed, telling him to share it with Gallo. Another explanation is that Juan Godoy decided to share a third of the mining rights with his friend Juan José Callejas; Callejas used to work for Gallo and transferred the rights to him. Godoy and his associates inscribed the discovery as La Descubridora (lit. The Discovery). Just a week later Gallo bought all rights from Godoy and his brother. The finding attracted thousands of people to the place and generated significant wealth. The amount paid for the rights to the Godoy brothers amounted to as little as 0.5% of the earnings of the mine in 1834.

Having squandered the fortune earned from the selling of his minings rights Godoy sought and was granted work in La Descubridora by Gallo. The conditions of work offered by Gallo were favourable and Godoy was able to make a small fortune again which allowed him to quit work and move to the city of La Serena. In La Serena Godoy settled as a farmer and married again. Godoy is known to have died in his 40s and left his second wife and children in poverty. When this came to light the Mining Council of Copiapó (Junta Minera de Copiapó) made a grant to Godoy's widow and sons. (Note: In contrast, the brother of Juan, José Godoy is not known to have fallen into poverty, he owned at least three houses one in Copiapó, one in Caldera and one in San Fernando, but had other properties as well. Later in life he migrated –apparently permanently– to Jáchal in Argentina.)

The settlement at the foot of the Chañarcillo mountain was named Pueblo de Juan Godoy in 1846. The mineral juangodoyite (Na_{2}Cu(CO_{3})_{2}) was named after him in 2005.
