= Ramón Silva Bahamondes =

Chilean singer and radio announcer (1944–2020)

Ramón Óscar Silva Bahamondes, better known as Moncho Silva (Valparaíso, 16 June 1944 – Viña del Mar, 3 September 2020), was a Chilean singer and radio host.

== Biography ==
The son of Juan Ramón Felipe Silva Billa and Adelina Emma Bahamondes Carrasco, he studied at the Colegio San Pedro Nolasco.

He began singing at school participating in folk groups, and made his first recording with the group Los del Sendero together with the singer José Alfredo Fuentes. Between 1966 and 1968, he joined the vocal quartet Clan 91.

During his career as radio host, he was one of the founders of the Radio Festival of Viña del Mar in 1976. He worked in Radio Portales de Valparaíso hosting the program Portaleando la mañana.

In Santiago he worked for Radio Gigante and Radio Portales. On television, in 1986 he was part of the international jury of the XXVII International Festival of the Song in Viña del Sea. That same year he was a panelist for the program Goal Show on UCV Television. He was a music producer at Channel 13.

In his later years, he returned to the Valparaíso Region to live in Concón. He worked at Radio Congreso. His last job was at the Concón community radio station until mid-August 2020, when he was hospitalized at the Admiral Nef Naval Hospital for COVID-19, during the pandemic in Chile; he died on September 3 of the same year aged 76.
