= 1859 Chilean revolution =

- Part of History of Chile(Conservative Republic)
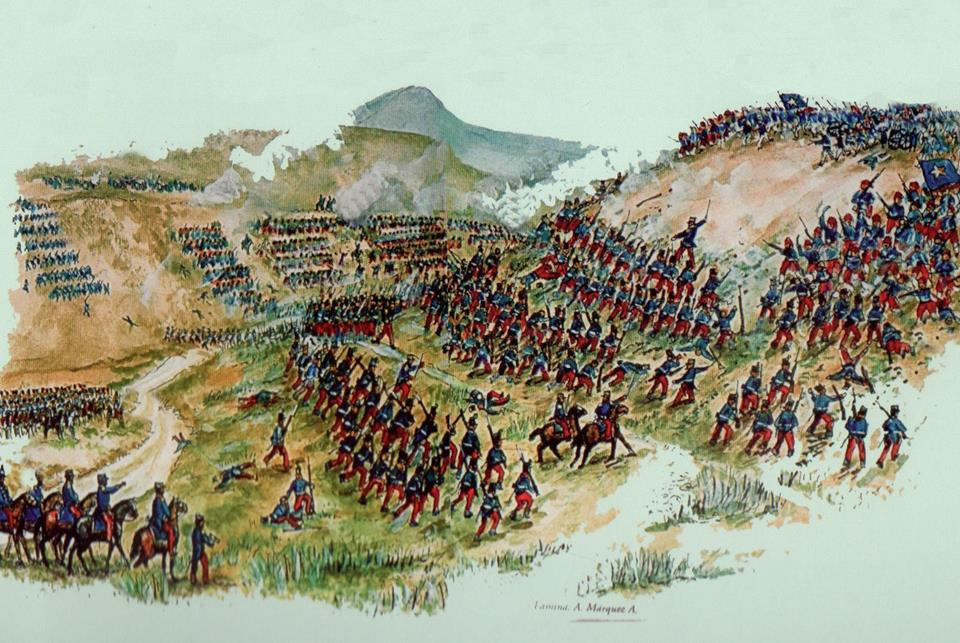
- The Battle of Los Loros
Date	January 5 – May 21, 1859
Location	Chile
Result	Conservative government victory

Belligerents
Conservative government	Provisional Government of Atacama; Liberal Party rebels

Commanders and leaders
Manuel Montt Torres; Col. José María Silva Chávez; José Manuel Pinto Arias; Juan Vidaurre Leal	Pedro León Gallo Goyenechea; Pedro Pablo Muñoz; Ramón Arancibia Vicente Zorrilla; Nicolás Tirapegui

Strength
2,400 (January); 6,200 – 7,000 (May)	2,000

The Chilean Revolution of 1859 was the second attempt by the Chilean Liberals to overthrow their country's Conservative government. Like the first attempt in 1851, it ended in failure. 5,000 people were killed during the fighting.

== Battle of Los Loros ==
On March 14, 1859, the Liberal rebels defeated a government force at La Serena, killing 60 government soldiers, wounding 100 and taking 250 prisoner. In addition, they captured 4 pieces of artillery, while their own losses were 40 killed.

== Battle of Maipón ==
On April 12, 1859, government forces and Liberal rebels clashed in Chillán Viejo. 20 rebels and 13 government soldiers were killed and 70 rebels and 55 government soldiers were wounded. 300 rebels were taken prisoner by the government.

== Battle of Cerro Grande ==
On April 29, 1859, a government army of 3,000 soldiers defeated a rebel force of less than 2,000 in La Serena; killing 100 rebels and capturing another 500 as well as all of the rebel artillery pieces. 50 government soldiers were killed.
