= Tres Puntas =

Silver mine in Chile

- Location within Atacama Region Location within Chile
- Location: Atacama Region, Chile; 26°50′58.89″S 69°57′38.13″W
- Products: Silver

Tres Puntas is silver deposit and mine in Chile's Atacama Region. It is located 80 km north of the regional capital Copiapó. It ows its name from the skyline of three hills nearby that are visible from the road affar. Tres Puntas was discovered in 1848 sparking the largest silver rush in Chile since Chañarcillo was discovered in 1832. The deposit was discovered by Miguel Osorio but came to be owned by Apolinario Soto.

According to historian Oriel Álvarez Gómez the site is the same one rumoured to have been discovered in 1792 by Fermín Guerra, an indigenous and mestizo woodcutter who used to transit the zone. Its location was recorded in written a derrotero In the early 1840s Jotabeche made an unsuccesfull expedition to find the ore described in the derrotero.
