= Agua Amarga =

Defunct silver mining district in Chile's Atacama Region

Coordinates: 28°49′54.23″S 70°47′23.87″W

Agua Amarga (lit. Bitter Water) is a silver deposit and defunct mining district in Chile's Atacama Region. It is located 30 km south of Vallenar. Agua Amarga was discovered in 1811 and its silver was instrumental to finance the Chilean War of Independence. An enquiry by Ignacy Domeyko tells of 150 individual mines active in Agua Amarga in 1822. Calera, Colorada and Aris are mentioned as the most productive mines of Agua Amarga.

Following Agua Amarga, further prospecting led to the discovery of silver in Arqueros in 1825 and in Chañarcillo in 1832. This last prospect ushered the Chilean silver rush.
