= Mario Bahamonde =

Mario Bahamonde Silva (1910–1979) was a Chilean poet, critic, short story writer and teacher. He was born in Taltal. He was the rector of the Liceo de Antofagasta. He was recognized as a key literary figure in the north of Chile, and wrote several books about the region and its arts and culture.

He died in Antofagasta.

== Selected works ==
- Tres cuentos del norte, 1943
- Pampa volcada, stories, 1945
- De cuan lejos viene el tiempo, stories, 1951
- Huella rota, short novel, 1955
- Puerto de embarque, short novel, 1955
- A la vida, poetry, 1956
- Antofagasta, pasion y poesia, 1961
- Antologia de la poesia nortina, 1966
- Guia de la produccion intelectual nortina, 1971
- Pampinos y salitreros, essay, 1973
- Derroteros y cangalla, stories, 1978
- El caudillo de Copiapo, novel, 1978
- Diccionaio de voces del norte de Chile, 1979
- Gente de greda o los ceremoniales del tiempo, novel, 1981
