= Oreste Plath =

Chilean writer and folklorist

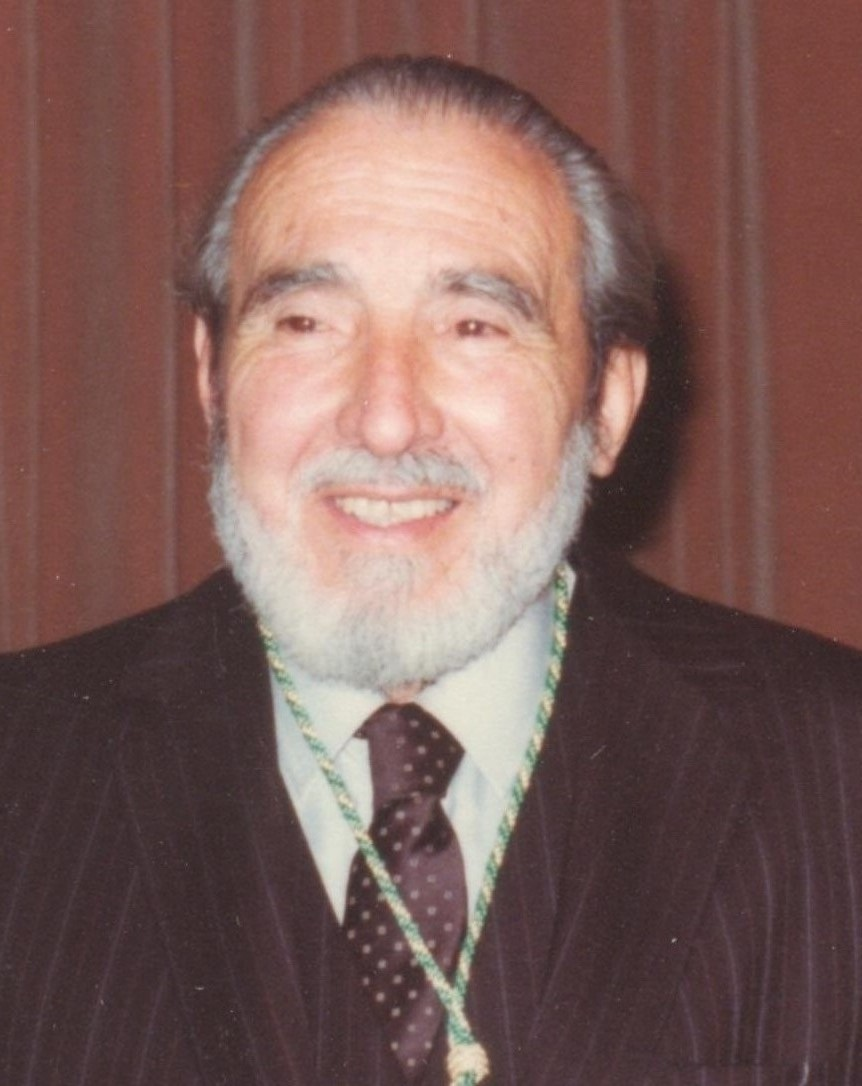
- Born: 13 August 1907
- Died: 24 July 1996 (aged 88)
- Notable works: Poemario; Folklore chileno

César Octavio Müller Leiva (13 August 1907 – 24 July 1996), mostly known under the pseudonym Oreste Plath, was a Chilean writer and folklorist. In 1942, he began studying folklore, making trips to neighboring countries like Bolivia, Brazil and Argentina. In 1982, he was elected to the Academia Chilena de la Lengua.

In June 1973 he participated in the Primer Congreso del Hombre Andino held in northern Chile. There he coordinated alongside Julia Elena Fortún the symposium on "Basic problems of the study of Andean folklore". However, the 1973 Chilean coup d'état on September 11 hindered the publication of the conference proceedings.
