= Academia Chilena de la Lengua =

Language institution in Chile

- Academia Chilena de la Lengua
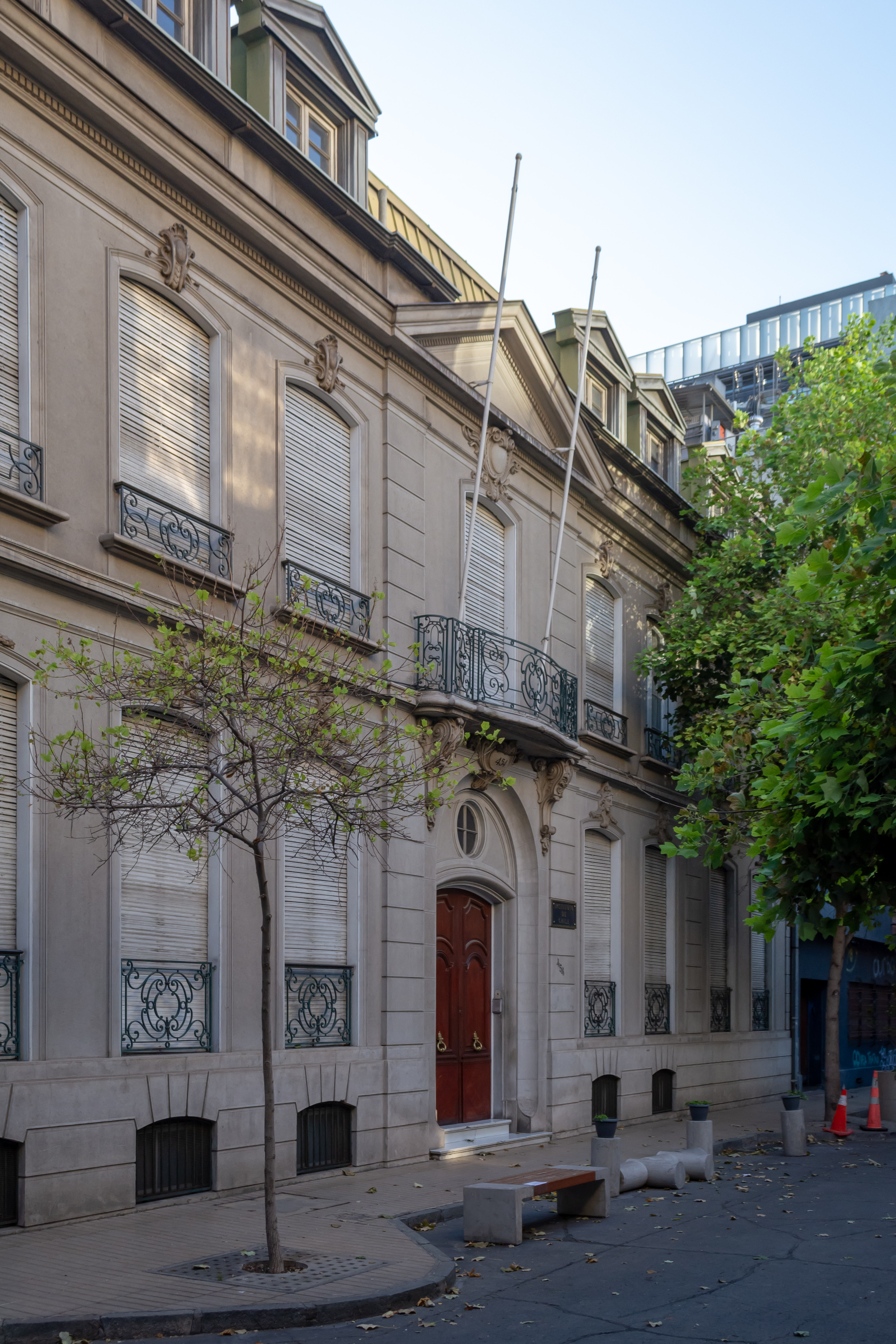
- Headquarters of the Academia Chilena de la Lengua in Santiago
- Formation: June 5, 1885
- Type: Language academy
- Purpose: Regulation and study of the Spanish language in Chile
- Headquarters: Almirante Montt 453, Santiago, Chile
- Region served: Chile
- Members: 36 full members, plus correspondent and honorary members
- Official language: Spanish
- Director: Adriana Valdés Budge
- Parent organization: Association of Academies of the Spanish Language; Instituto de Chile
- Website: https://academiachilenadelalengua.cl

The Academia Chilena de la Lengua (Spanish for Chilean Language Academy) is an association of academics and experts on the use of the Spanish language in Chile. It is a member of the Association of Academies of the Spanish Language and is a part of the Instituto de Chile.

== History and purpose ==
The academy was founded in Santiago de Chile on June 5, 1885. It started out with 18 members designated by the Royal Spanish Academy. Its stated aims, according to its bylaws, are: to ensure the purity and splendor of the Spanish language, to contribute to the work of the Royal Spanish Academy and the Association of Academies of the Spanish Language, and to collaborate with other institutions on matters related to the language and its literature, particularly Chilean literature.

Today, its members are chosen by co-option. The academy currently has 36 members, as well as a variable number of correspondent members in various Chilean regions and abroad. It has several honorary members, including the Chilean poet Gabriela Mistral, the Spanish philologist Víctor García de la Concha, and Pope John Paul II.

== Prizes ==
The academy gives out five prizes every year:

- The Academy Prize, to the author of the best literary work published in Chile
- The Alejandro Silva de la Fuente Prize, to a journalist who has demonstrated distinguished use of the language in their work
- The Alonso de Ercilla Prize, to a person or institution that has contributed to the understanding and promotion of Chilean literature
- The Doctor Rodolfo Oroz Prize, to authors of scientific research related to the language
- The Oreste Plath Prize, to a person or institution that has distinguished itself for the promotion and spread of Chilean folk art

== Publications ==
The academy produces the following periodicals:

- Boletín de la Academia de la Lengua, since 1915 (72 nearly annual issues)
- Cuadernos del Centenario, since 1985, a series that pairs tributes to deceased members and specialized work
- Notas Idiomáticas, since 1996, a quarterly bulletin in cooperation with UNESCO in Chile

It has also published dictionaries, including the 1976 Diccionario del Habla Chilena.

== Directors ==
Since its founding, the academy has been led by the following directors:

1. José Victorino Lastarria (1885–1888)
2. Monseñor Crescente Errázuriz Valdivieso (1914–1931)
3. Miguel Luis Amunátegui Reyes (1931–1949)
4. Alejandro Silva de la Fuente (1949–1952)
5. Ricardo Dávila Silva (1952–1959)
6. Rodolfo Oroz Scheibe (1959–1980)
7. Alejandro Garretón Silva (1980)
8. Roque Esteban Scarpa (1980–1995)
9. Alfredo Matus Olivier (1995–2018)
10. Adriana Valdés Budge (2018–present)

== See also ==
- Real Academia Española
- Asociación de Academias de la Lengua Española
- Chilean Spanish
- es:Anexo:Miembros de la Academia Chilena de la Lengua (list of members)
