= Chilean wheat cycle =

In Chilean historiography, the wheat cycle (Spanish: ciclo triguero) refers to two episodes of booming wheat exports and related changes in society and agriculture. The first cycle occurred from 1687 to the independence wars and was caused by heavy demand in Peru. The importance of wheat had led the 18th century in Chile to be labelled the wheat century (Spanish: siglo del trigo).

The second cycle started in the mid-19th century, fueled by the California and Australian gold rushes and ended definitively during the Long Depression in the 1870s.

== First cycle ==
Chile has a history of exporting cereals to Peru dating back to 1687 when Peru was struck by both an earthquake and a stem rust epidemic. Chilean soil and climatic conditions were better for cereal production than those of Peru and Chilean wheat was cheaper and of better quality than Peruvian wheat. According to historians Villalobos et al., the 1687 events were only the detonant factor for exports to start. The Chilean Central Valley, La Serena and Concepción were the districts that came to be involved in cereal export to Peru. Compared with the 19th century, the area cultivated with wheat was very small and production modest.

Initially Chilean latifundia could not meet the wheat demand due to a labour shortage, so had to incorporate temporary workers in addition to the permanent staff. Another response by the latifundia to labour shortages was to act as merchants, buying wheat produced by independent farmers or from farmers that hired land. In the period 1700 to 1850, this second option was overall more lucrative.

The independence wars in Chile (1810–1818) and Peru (1809–1824) had a negative impact on the Chilean wheat industry. Trade was disrupted and armies in Chile pillaged the countryside. The Guerra a muerte phase was particularly destructive and ended only to see a period of outlaw banditry (e.g. Pincheira brothers) occur until the late 1820s. Trade with Peru did not fully recover after the independence struggles.

== Second cycle ==
Chilean wheat exports to California from 1848 to 1854 (in qqm)
Year	Grains	Flour
1848	3000	n/a
1849	87,000	69,000
1850	277,000	221,000
1854	63,000	50,000

In the 19th century, access to the Californian and Australian markets made wheat export a very lucrative activity. In the mid-19th century, those countries experienced large gold rushes, which created a large demand for wheat. Chile was at the time the only significant source of wheat on the Pacific rim.

At the same time as the wheat cycle, new irrigation canals were built and apiculture and some machines introduced into Chilean agriculture. Apart from that, new markets were explored for Chilean agricultural products.

The wheat boom did not last for long; by 1855, California managed to supply itself with wheat and from 1858 onwards it went over to export wheat to Chile. The Australian gold rush of 1851 had the effect of decreasing the labour used in agriculture, forcing the colony to import wheat from Chile sustaining Chilean wheat exports whilst the Californian market vanished. After the gold rushes of California and Australia were over, those regions began exporting wheat competing with Chilean wheat, causing from the mid-1860s onwards wheat exports to be shifted to England. The "cycle" came to an end in the late 1870s due to the increased technification of agriculture in the United States and Argentina and the competition of Russia and Canada. The end of the wheat cycle added to the already difficult situation that Chilean economy was passing through in the 1870s. Exports to England continued at least until 1890.
