= Norte Chico, Chile =

North-central natural region of Chile

Natural regions of Chile.

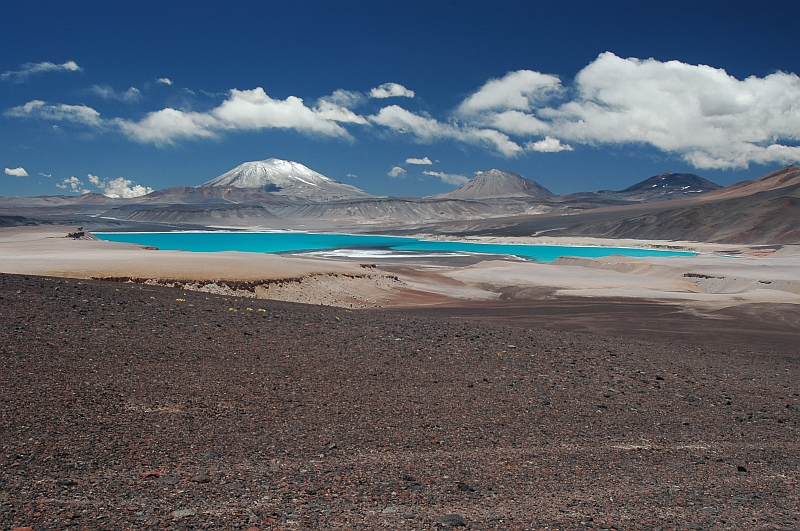
Nevado de Incahuasi

The Norte Chico (lit. Small North) region is one of five natural regions of continental Chile, as defined by the government agency CORFO in 1950. Its northern border is formed by the limit with the Far North, to the west lies the Pacific Ocean, to the east the Andes mountains and Argentina, and to the south the Zona Central natural region. Although from a strictly geographic point of view, this natural region corresponds to the Chilean territory between the rivers Copiapó and Aconcagua. Traditionally, the Norte Chico refers to the zone comprising the regions of Atacama and Coquimbo. This region was home to the Diaguita people.

== Geography ==
The near north (Norte Chico) extends from the southern border of the Atacama Desert to about 32° south latitude, or just north of Santiago. It is a semiarid region whose central area receives an average of about 25 mm of rain during each of the four winter months, with trace amounts the rest of the year. The near north is also subject to droughts. The temperatures are moderate, with an average of 18.5 °C during the summer and about 12 °C during the winter at sea level. The winter rains and snowmelt from the Andes Mountains provide water to rivers in the Norte Chico region, even though the river flow varies with the seasons. The slopes of the Andes are precipitous, the general surface is rough, and in the north the higher ground and coast are still barren.

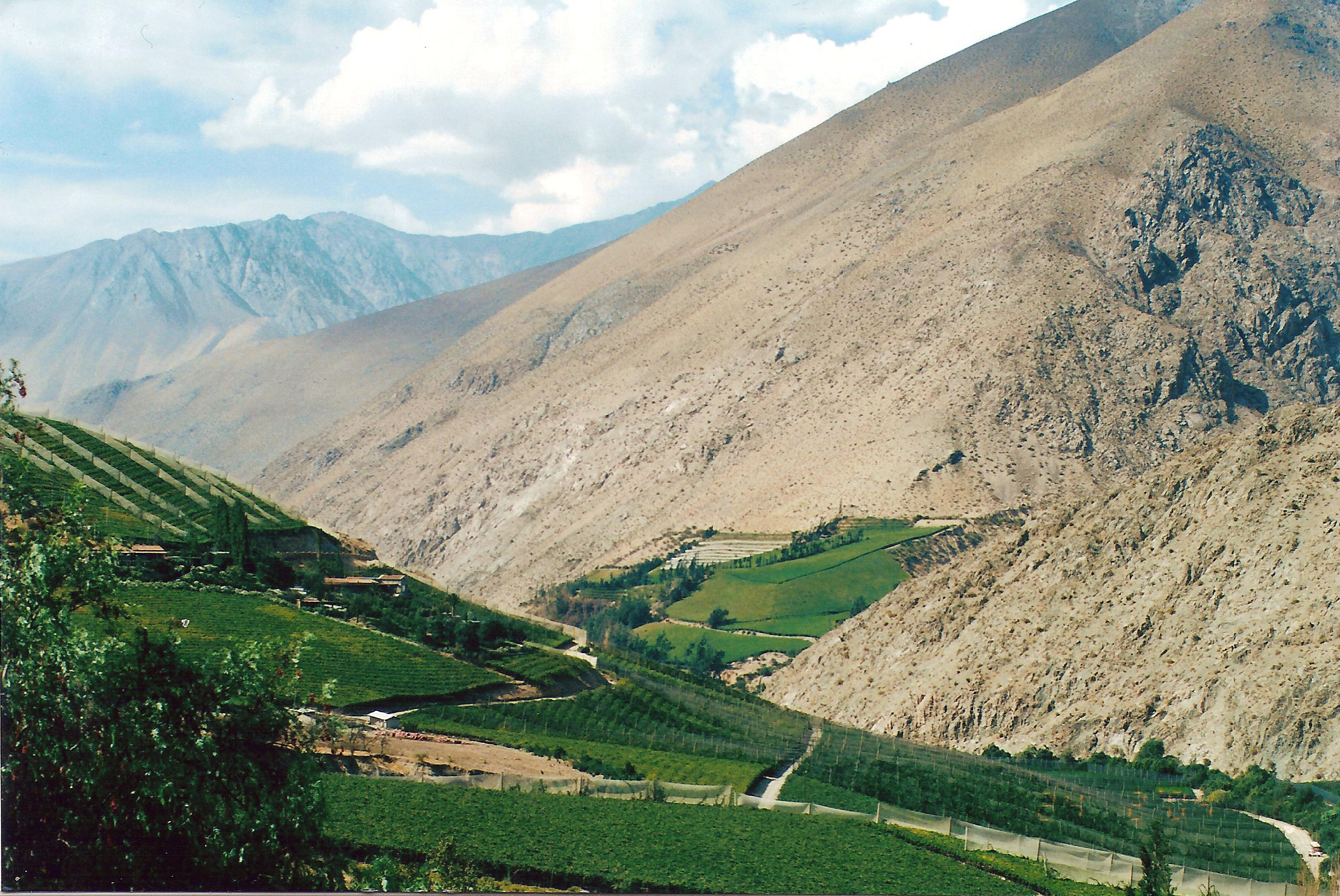
Agriculture in Elqui valley

As in the far north, the coastal areas of the near north have a distinct microclimate. In those sections where the airborne moisture of the sea is trapped by high bluffs overlooking the ocean, Valdivian temperate rainforest develop as the vegetation precipitates the vapor in the form of a misty rain. Notable examples can be found in the Bosque de Fray Jorge National Park. Because the river valleys provide breaks in the coastal elevations, maritime moisture can penetrate inland and further decrease the generally arid climate in those valleys. The higher elevations in the interior sections are covered with shrubs and cacti of various kinds.

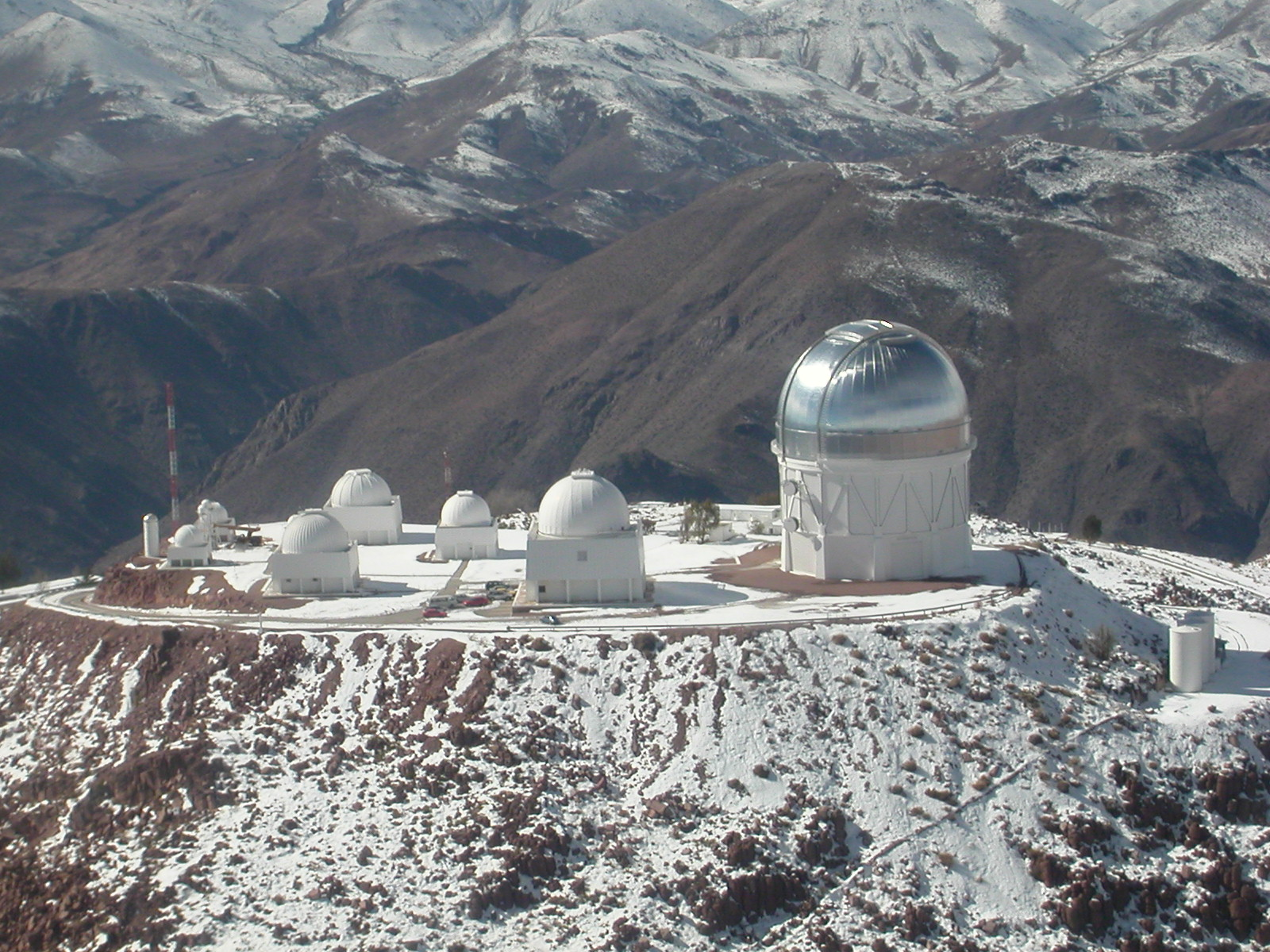
Cerro Tololo

Norte Chico is a highly mountainous district where distinct ranges or elongated spurs cross the country from the Andes to the coast, forming transverse valleys of great beauty and fertility. The most famous of these is the Elqui Valley. The deep transverse valleys provide broad areas for cattle raising and, most important, fruit growing, an activity that has developed greatly since the mid-1970s. Nearly all Chilean pisco is produced in the near north (Chilean laws defines the pisco as a drink produced in the Near North). The cultivation of the soil becomes possible, at first through irrigation and then with the aid of light periodical rains.

Some areas of Norte Chico feature a very dry air and negligible cloud cover, which make them an excellent location for telescopes. Notable astronomical observatories in the district include Cerro Tololo Inter-American Observatory and La Silla Observatory.

The Andes of Norte Chico are home to the first, second and fourth mountain highest in Chile. Corresponding respectively to Ojos del Salado, Nevado Tres Cruces and Nevado de Incahuasi.

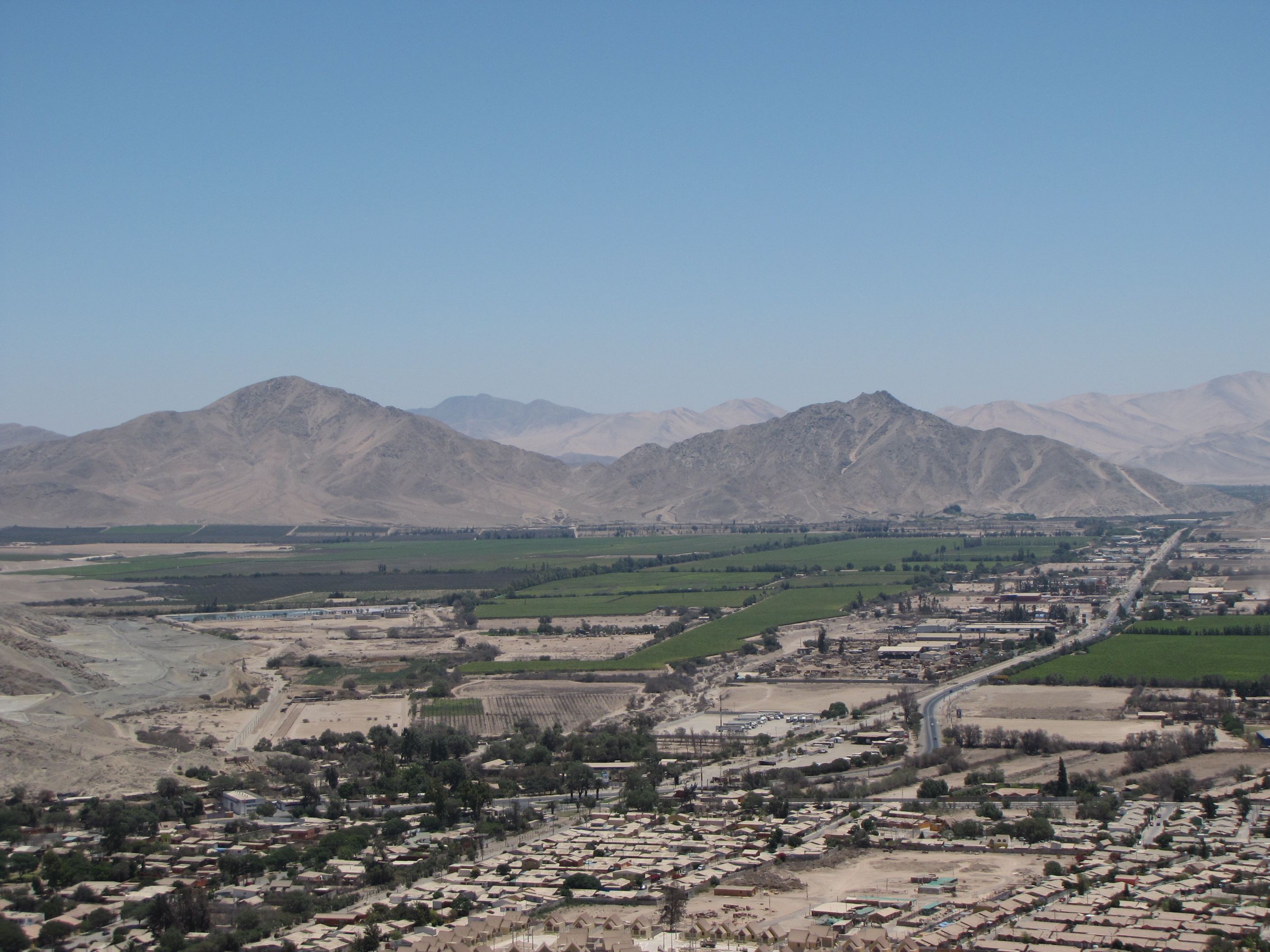
Irrigated fields in the outskirts Copiapó.

=== Hydrography ===
==== Rivers ====
The principal rivers of this natural region are Copiapó, Huasco, Elqui, Limarí and Choapa. The Copiapó, which once discharged into the sea, is now practically exhausted in irrigating a small fertile valley in which stands the city of that name. The Copiapó and Huasco rivers have comparatively short courses, but they receive a considerable volume of water from the higher sierras. The latter is also used to irrigate a small, cultivated valley. The rivers of the region of Coquimbo (the Elqui, Limarí and Choapa) exist under less arid conditions, and like those of the northern portion of the Valparaíso Region (namely: Petorca, La Ligua and Aconcagua), are used to irrigate a much larger area of cultivated territory.

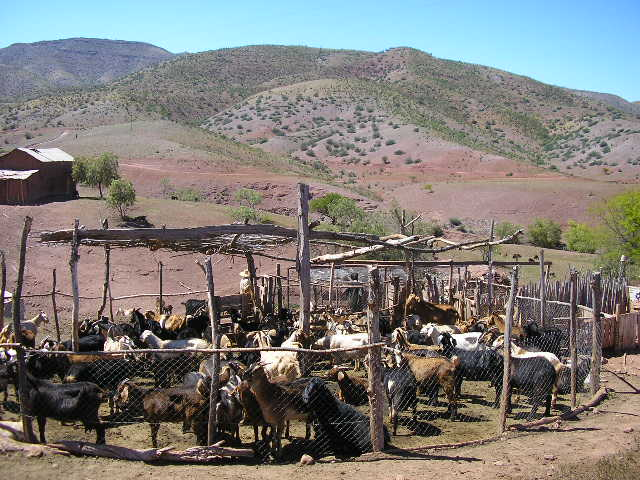
Goat husbandry is common through Norte Chico, however it produces severe erosion and desertification. Image from upper Limarí River

== See also ==
- Astronomy in Chile
- Chilean silver rush
