= Chañarcillo =

- Mining town
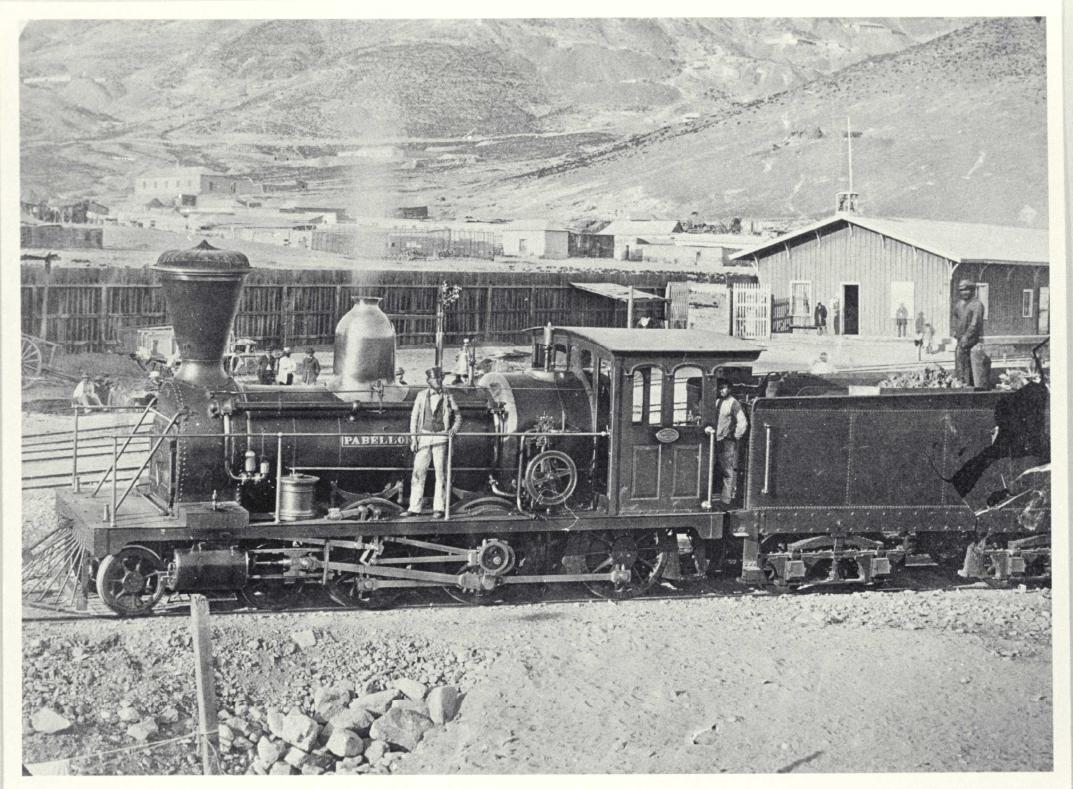
- Chañarcillo train station in 1862

- Location in Chile Chañarcillo (Chile)
- Coordinates: 27°48′42″S 70°24′56″W
- Country: Chile
- Region: Atacama Region
- Province: Copiapó Province

Chañarcillo is a town and mine in the Atacama Desert of Copiapó Province, Atacama Region, Chile, located near Vallenar and 60 km from Copiapó. It is noted for its silver mining. The town grew after the Chañarcillo silver mine, discovered on May 16, 1832, by Juan Godoy, sparked the Chilean silver rush. It grew in prominence in the second half of the nineteenth century and became important in the Atacama mining industry and one of the most important mines to the Chilean economy. It was connected by railway before 1862. Today the settlement is largely in ruins.

The Chanarcillo District produced at least $100 million in silver before abandonment. This production from up to 20 mines was limited to a third of a square mile. From 1860 until 1885, 2,500,000 kg of silver was produced. Most production occurred before 1930. From then until 1960, only minor amounts of silver were produced by removing pillars in mines or from the dump material.

In 1870, 1,570 miners worked in the Chañarcillo mines. However, the mines were exhausted by 1874 and mining largely ended in 1888 after they were accidentally flooded. Despite this, Chañarcillo was the most productive mining district in 19th century Chile.

Some water holes in the Chañarcillo area are Ña Justa and Yerbas Buenas. Reportedly, in 1536 Diego de Almagro's expedition replenished their water supply in Ña Justa on its way south.

Since August 2026, Canadian mining company Trinity Silver Corp. has held an option agreement to acquire the historic Chañarcillo mine and is working towards restarting operations under the name "Nueva Chañarcillo" ("New Chañarcillo")

== Geology ==
Chanarcillo is on the south flank of a dome, the Sierra de Chanarcillo, characterized by radial fractures and northwest striking faults. Silver ore occurs in nearly vertical veins within these fractures and faults within interbedded limestones and tuffs. This ore zone is an oxidized and supergene sulfide enriched rock. Oxidized ores occur above the water table and supergene sulfide enrichment below.

In the oxidized zone, ore minerals include native silver and argentite have been replaced by cerargyrite, iodobromite, bromyrite, embolite, and iodyrite. In the supergene sulfide enriched zone, ore minerals include pearceite, proustite, tetrahedrite, polybasite, and pyrargyrite.

Groups of large crystals have been found at Chañarcillo, including proustite, stephanite, chlorargyrite and adamite.

== See also ==
- Agua Amarga
- Arqueros
- Tres Puntas
- Mining in Chile
