= Huascoaltinos =

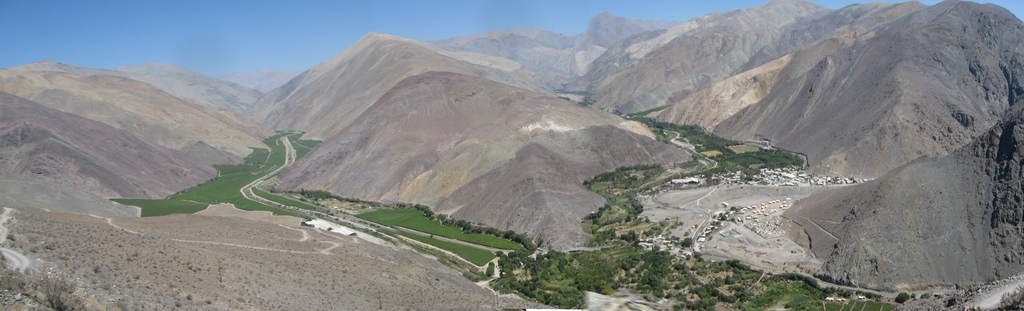
Birth of Huasco River at the confluence of Del Tránsito River (left) and Del Carmen River (right).

Huascoaltinos is an Indigenous Diaguita lineage organization in Atacama Region of northern Chile. The organization represents Indigenous farming interests in Valle del Tránsito in the commune of Alto del Carmen at the headwaters of Huasco River. The organization is made up of representants of 260 families. The organization has been opposed to the establishment of the gold mine of El Morro.

== See also ==
- Gold mining in Chile
- Sociedad Nacional de Agricultura
