= Tres Quebradas Airport =

Airport in Chile

- IATA: none; ICAO: SCTQ

Summary
- Airport type: Private
- Serves: Alto del Carmen, Chile
- Elevation AMSL: 11,690 ft / 3,563 m
- Coordinates: 29°15′34″S 70°05′15″W

Map
- Location of Tres Quebradas Airport in Chile

Runways
Direction	Length		Surface
Direction	m	ft	Surface
13/31	890	2,920	Dirt
- Source: Landings.com Google Maps GCM

Tres Quebradas Airport (Spanish: Aeropuerto de Tres Quebradas, (ICAO: SCTQ)) is an extremely high elevation airport serving mining operations in the Atacama Region of Chile, near the Argentina border.

The runway is in the narrow valley of the Del Tránsito River, an eventual tributary of the Huasco River. Due to mountain elevations over 18,000 feet (5,500 m) to the east, a high terrain escape route must be northwest, down the valley. The narrowness of the valley leaves little room for course reversal.

== See also ==
- Transport in Chile
- List of airports in Chile
