= Hacienda Atacama =

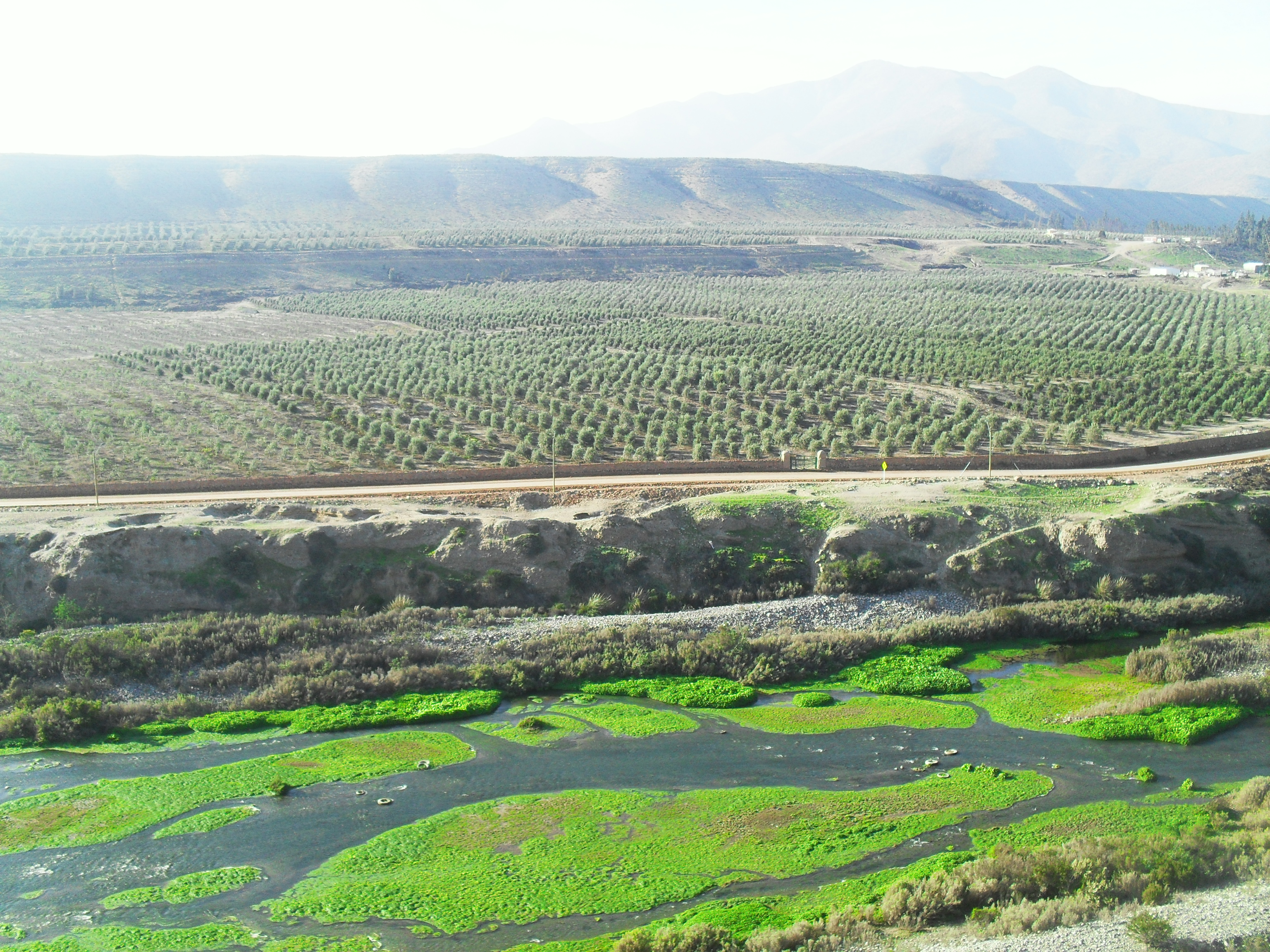
- Olive grooves and Huasco River next to Hacienda Atacama.
- Interactive map of Hacienda Atacama
- Coordinates: 28.5147°S 70.9983°W
- Region: Atacama
- Province: Huasco
- Municipality: Freirina
- Commune: Freirina

Government
  - Type: Municipal

Population (2017)
  - Total: 117
- Time zone: UTC−04:00 (Chilean Standard)
  - Summer (DST): UTC−03:00 (Chilean Daylight)
- Area code: Country + town = 56 + 51

Hacienda Atacama is a populated place and a group of associated agricultural properties in the commune of Freirina, in the Atacama Region of Chile. It is located east of Freirina, along Route C-46, crossing the Nicolasa Bridge, which lies in the lower part of the hacienda of the same name. The census of 2017 counts 117 inhabitants and list Hacienda Atacama as a hamlet (Spanish: caserío). Hacienda Atacama is irrigated by the San José channel.

The local economy is primarily based on agriculture, mainly olive groves. There is also a camping in the locality.

Rancho Atacama lies in the hacienda Atacama being this a venue for popular and traditional festivals, where the rodeo arena is located. Official rodeo competitions are held there, and important national rodeo events have taken place.

== History ==
In 1884, Emilio Marambio founded an explosives factory on this Hacienda.

Until the 1970s, a dairy producing milk, cheese, and butter operated in the town, forming the economic base of the area. After its final closure in 1978, the land was divided among the factory workers.

By 1966 Hacienda Atacama was owned by Sociedad Agrícola Ñuble y Rupanco. Hungarian immigrant Daniel Farkas owned once Hacienda Atacama.
