= Huasco (disambiguation) =

Huasco may refer to:

- Huasco Province
- Huasco River
- Huasco, Chile
- Salar del Huasco
