= El Morro mine =

Mine in Chile

- Location: Atacama Region, Chile
- Products: Copper; Gold; Molybdenum
- Company: Newmont (50%); Teck (50%)

The El Morro mine is one of the largest gold mines in Chile and in the world. The mine is located in the north of the country in the Atacama Region. The mine has estimated reserves of 6.7 million oz of gold. The mine also holds reserves amounting to 449.5 million tonnes of ore grading 0.49% copper.

Contractors who have worked in this mine are Hatch, AMEC, Fluor Corporation, Bechtel. Siemens was awarded to do electrical engineering.

A 70% ownership stake was sold by Xstrata to Barrick Gold for $465 million USD in 2009, with the remaining 30% owned by New Gold Inc.

Development of the mine was initially halted in 2012 due to a lack of consultation with the local indigenous Diaguita community, but in 2014 a Chilean appeals ruled the project could proceed. This was then overturned by the Supreme Court of Chile later that year.

In 2015, the mine was combined with the nearby Relincho project to a single venture called NuevaUnión split 50-50 between Goldcorp and Teck. Goldcorp was merged with Newmont in 2019.

== See also ==
- El Alto mining project
- Huascoaltinos
- Pascua Lama
