= El Alto mining project =

El Alto is a gold mining project in the Andes of Alto del Carmen, Atacama Region, Chile. The project is being carried out by Barrick Gold. It has been described as a replacement for Pascua Lama, a mine which the Chilean courts ordered to be closed in 2018. On March 12, 2025 the project was submitted to the Environmental Assessment Service (Servicio de Evaluación Ambiental). Diario UChile has called the project "Pascua Lama 2.0", and noted that it has caused concern in the indigenous Diaguita community of Huasco Valley.

In March 2025 it was estimated that if the project was approved by the Environmental Assessment Service ground work could start in July 2026. In January 2026 the project was approved to carry out 62 drillings for mineral exploration from 43 different sites.
