= Alto del Carmen =

- Commune
- Coat of arms Commune of Alto del Carmen in the Atacama Region Location in Chile
- Coordinates (commune): 28°45′34″S 70°29′12″W
- Country: Chile
- Region: Atacama
- Province: Huasco Province

Government
  - Type: Municipality

Area
  - Total: 5,938.7 km^{2} (2,292.9 sq mi)
- Elevation: 819 m (2,687 ft)

Population (2012 Census)
  - Total: 5,034
  - Density: 0.8477/km^{2} (2.195/sq mi)
  - Urban: 0
  - Rural: 4,840

Sex
  - Men: 2,629
  - Women: 2,211
- Area code: (+56) 51
- Website: Municipality of Alto del Carmen

Alto del Carmen is a Chilean commune and village in Huasco Province, Atacama Region. The commune spans an area of 5,938.7 km^{2} (2,293 sq mi). The commune has two sub-sectors; Valle del Tránsito in the northeast and Valle del Carmen in the southwest. The former valley has a high concentration of indigenous Diaguitas and while in the latter ancestry tied to Spanish settlers is common.

The commune has an economy based on agriculture, in particular grapes for pisco and pajarete, and mining. The indigenous lineage organization Huascoaltinos represents farming interests in Valle del Tránsito. The now inactive gold mine of Pascua Lama lies in the southeastern edge of commune. The gold-mining project of El Alto remains as of January 2026 active in the northeastern part of the commune. The discovery of valuable black marble in the commune was announced in December 2024.

== Geography, climate and geology ==
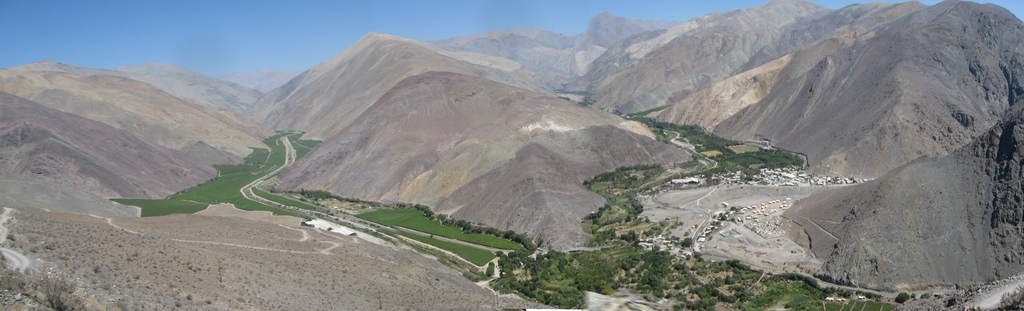
Birth of Huasco River at the confluence of Del Tránsito River (left) and Del Carmen River (right).

Geographically the commune lies in the natural region of Norte Chico and the Transverse Valleys of Chile.

The climate is the lower parts of commune is one of a marginal desert and at higher elevations it is one of high-altitude marginal desert. Most soils in the commune are thin, and stony aridisols. In the valley floor soils tend to be less stony. Much of the geology of the commune is made up of metamorphic and plutonic rock of Triassic or Paleozoic age. There are also parts where sedimentary rocks of Jurassic age are exposed. Large inverse geological faults and associated folds exists in the commune.

== Demographics ==
According to the 2002 census of the National Statistics Institute, Alto del Carmen had 4,840 inhabitants (2,629 men and 2,211 women), making the commune an entirely rural area. The population grew by 2% (95 persons) between the 1992 and 2002 censuses.

The 2024 census showed that the commune is both the poorest and the one with the oldest population (average age 43 years) in Atacama Region.

As of 2024 a third of the homes in the commune lacks one of more of the following; electricity connection, sewage system or potable water.

== Administration ==
As a commune, Alto del Carmen is a third-level administrative division of Chile administered by a municipal council, headed by an alcalde who is directly elected every four years.

Within the electoral divisions of Chile, Alto del Carmen is represented in the Chamber of Deputies by Mr. Alberto Robles (PRSD) and Mr. Giovanni Calderón (UDI) as part of the 6th electoral district, (together with Caldera, Tierra Amarilla, Vallenar, Freirina and Huasco). The commune is represented in the Senate by Isabel Allende Bussi (PS) and Baldo Prokurica Prokurica (RN) as part of the 3rd senatorial constituency (Atacama Region).
