= Santa Juana Dam =

Dam in Chile

Embalse Santa Juana
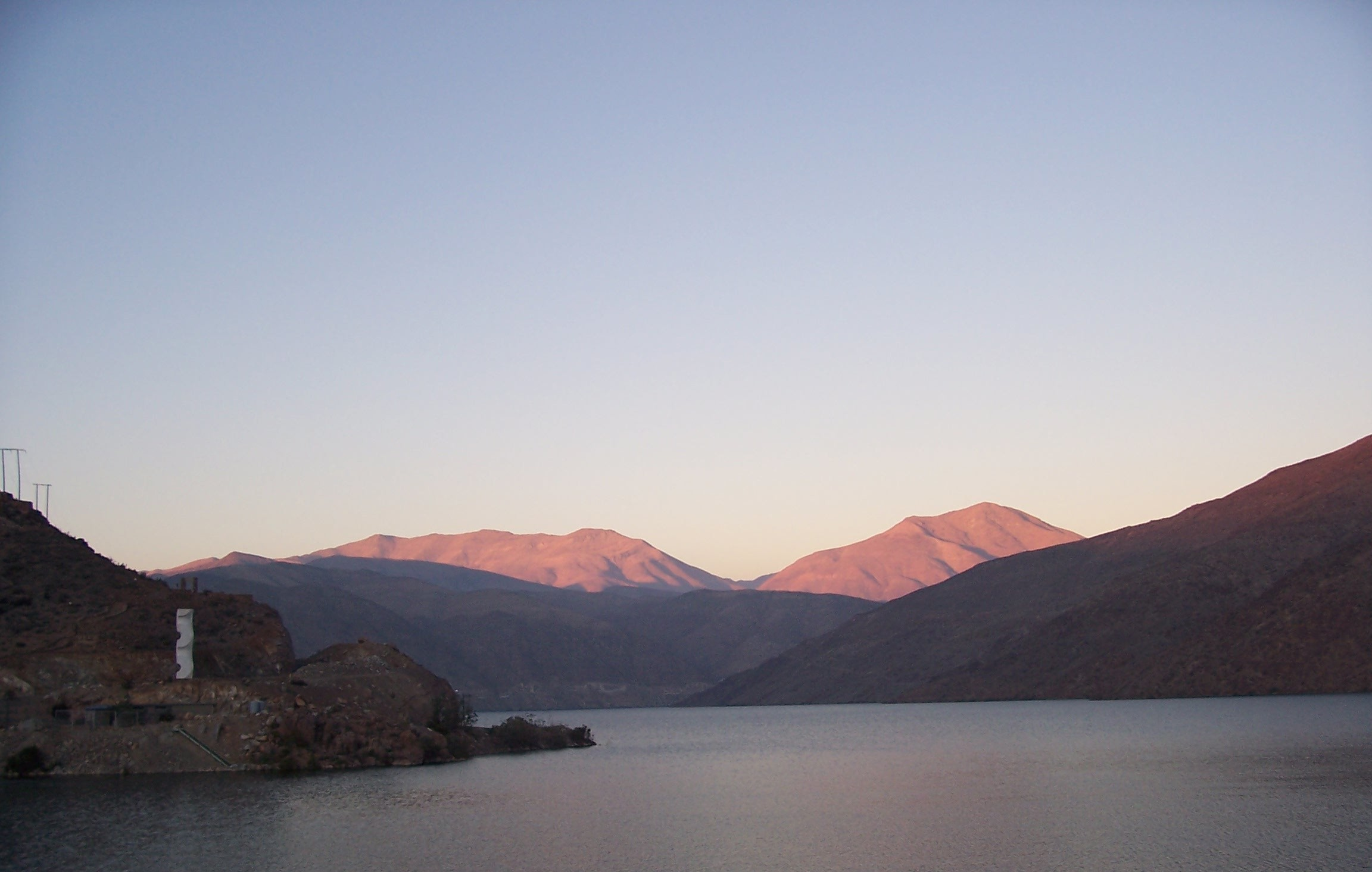

- Location within Atacama Region Location within Chile
- Coordinates: 28.677392°S 70.641376°W
- Type: reservoir
- Primary inflows: Huasco River
- Primary outflows: Huasco River
- Basin countries: Chile
- Max. length: 6.24 km (3.88 mi)
- Surface area: 410 ha (1,000 acres)
- Water volume: 166×10^{6} m^{3} (135,000 acre⋅ft)
- Dam: Santa Juana Dam

Santa Juana Dam (Spanish: Embalse Santa Juana) is a dam on the Huasco River and associated artificial lake, 15 kilometres (9.3 mi) southeast of the city of Vallenar, Atacama Region and 530 km north of Santiago, Chile.

In 1953 the Department of Hydraulics of the Ministry of Public Works established a camp to study the construction of the dam. With the establishment of the dam being discussed for decades, the final decision to build it came after a drought that lasted from 1988 to 1990. The dam was initially planned to be located just 2 kilometres (1.2 mi) downstream Alto del Carmen, but planners later moved the project downstream to its current location, where work began in 1991. The dam filled to full capacity for the first time in 1997 during a flood event.

The dam has contributed significantly to the agricultural development in the areas upstream of the river since periods of water scarcity no longer result in immediate water use restrictions for upstream users, given that downstream users are supplied by the dam.
