= Melica mollis =

Scientific classification
- Kingdom: Plantae
- Clade: Tracheophytes
- Clade: Angiosperms
- Clade: Monocots
- Clade: Commelinids
- Order: Poales
- Family: Poaceae
- Subfamily: Pooideae
- Genus: Melica
- Species: M. mollis

Binomial name
- Melica mollis Phil.

Species of plant

Melica mollis is a species of grass endemic to Chile where it grows in rock crevices at 340 metres (1,120 ft) above sea level.

== Description ==
The species is perennial, caespitose and densely clumped with 15–40 centimetres (5.9–15.7 in) long culms. The leaf-sheaths are tubular and are closed on one end with its surface being glabrous. The leaf-blades are 2–10 centimetres (0.79–3.94 in) long and 1.5–2.5 millimetres (0.059–0.098 in) wide with an acute apex. The surface is pubescent and is hairy as well. The eciliated margin have a ligule and is also erose and 0.3 millimetres (0.012 in) long. The panicle is linear, open, sencund, and is 6–10 centimetres (2.4–3.9 in) long. The main branches of the panicle are appressed and pilose axis.

Spikelets are elliptic, solitary, are the same size as panicle and are pediceled. The pedicels are ciliate, curved, filiform, and hairy. Besides the pedicels, the spikelets have 2 fertile florets which are diminished at the apex and have pubescent callus as well. The sterile florets are also present and are 2.5–3.5 millimetres (0.098–0.138 in) long, barren, elliptic, and clumped. Both the upper and lower glumes are hairy on the bottom, keelless, membranous, ovate and have puberulous surfaces. The other features are different though; Lower glume is 5–8 millimetres (0.20–0.31 in) long, while the upper one is 8–10 millimetres (0.31–0.39 in) long.

Its lemma have scaberulous surface with the fertile lemma being chartaceous, keelless, lanceolate and 6–8 millimetres (0.24–0.31 in) long by 2–3 millimetres (0.079–0.118 in). Lemma have ciliated margins, dentated apex, and the same surface as the glumes. Palea have ciliolated keels, is hairy, and is 2-veined with the surface that is identical to the chaffs and lemma. Flowers are 0.2 millimetres (0.0079 in) long, fleshy, oblong and truncate. They also grow together, have 2 lodicules and 3 anthers which are 1–1.5 millimetres (0.039–0.059 in) long. The fruits have caryopsis, are dark brown in colour with additional pericarp and linear hilum.

== Ecology ==
Melica mollis blooms from September to November from Huasco to Atacama provinces.

01-22-2007

-Good weekend - I'll be picking (c) up around 2:50 for her Appt.

Very happy this AM. Shool stor, O/T, then circle time is L.S. Good work in centers. Accurately identifying time to hour + 1/2 hour on both round - face and digital clocks. Great job in centers. Recess, swings. Lunch, Barely ate, then "cold". Could not get her to eat more, so back to classroom, sweatshirt. Spent time with Jenny. Math - learning to count by 10's. Music - watching muppet movie. When is her appt. with the psychiatrist? also, what did you learn from her other appts? Oh, and Thank you for the cake! It was great!
