= Bahía Inglesa =

Village in Copiapó, Chile

- Locality
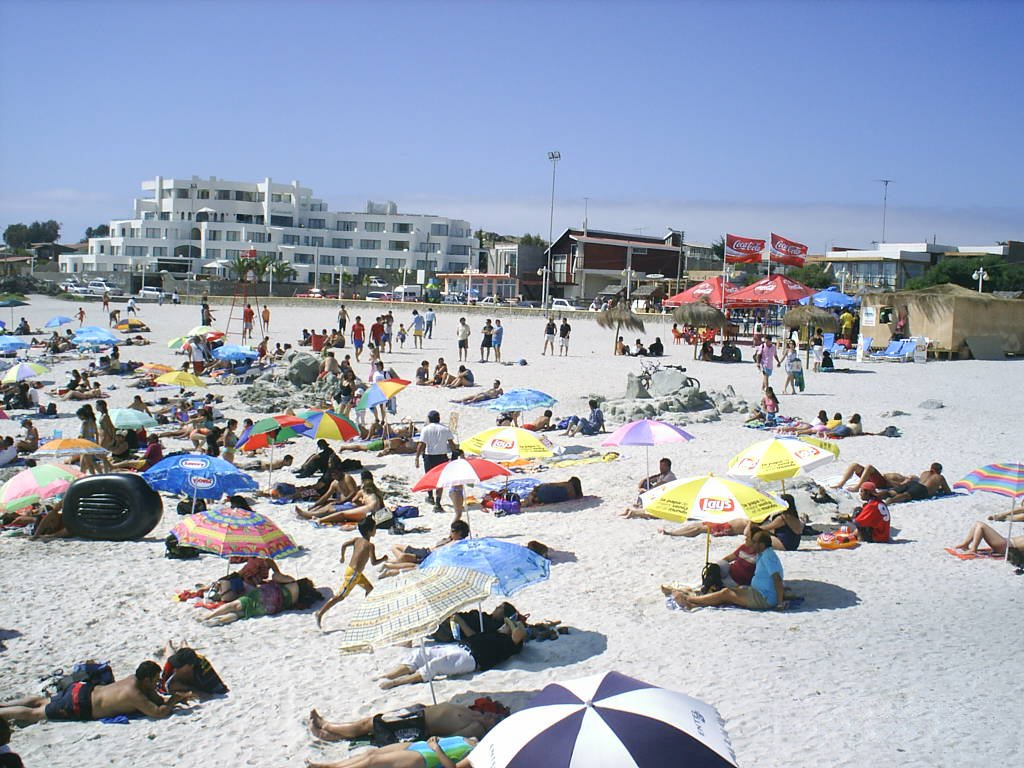
- Beach in Bahía Inglesa.

- Location within Chile
- Coordinates: 27°07′51″S 70°52′00″W
- Country: Chile
- Region: Atacama
- Province: Copiapó
- Commune: Caldera

Area
  - Total: 6.36 km^{2} (2.46 sq mi)
- Elevation: 10 m (33 ft)

Population (2017)
  - Total: 535
  - Density: 84.1/km^{2} (218/sq mi)

Bahia Inglesa ("English Bay") is a locality located near the port of Caldera in Atacama Region, Chile. It is situated at an average elevation of 10 meters above the sea level. As of 2017, it had a population of 535.
