= Freirina =

Freirina Santa Rosa
- Town and Commune
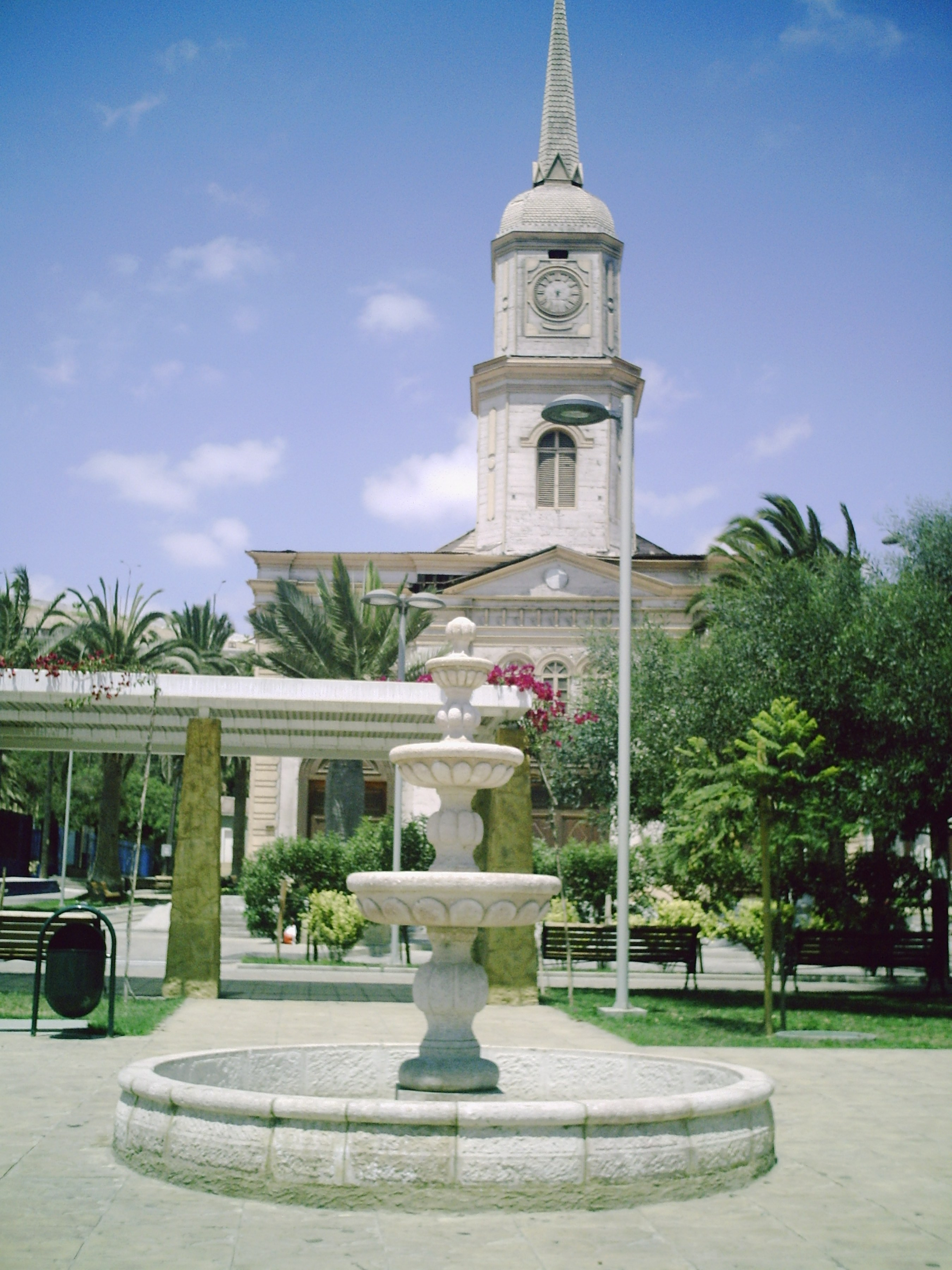
- Church of Santa Rosa de Lima

- Coat of arms Map of the commune of Freirina in the Atacama Region Location in Chile
- Coordinates: 28°30′31″S 71°04′43″W
- Country: Chile
- Region: Atacama
- Province: Huasco

Government
  - Type: Municipality
  - Alcalde: Roberto Bruzzone Galeb

Area
  - Total: 3,577.7 km^{2} (1,381.4 sq mi)
- Elevation: 102 m (335 ft)

Population (2012 Census)
  - Total: 6,038
  - Density: 1.688/km^{2} (4.371/sq mi)

Sex
  - Men: 2,800
  - Women: 2,866
- Time zone: UTC-4 (CLT)
  - Summer (DST): CLST utc_offset_DST = -3
- Area code: (+56) 51
- Website: imfreirina.cl

Freirina is a Chilean commune and town in Huasco Province, Atacama Region. The commune spans an area of 3,577.7 km^{2} (1,381 sq mi). Freirina is both an agricultural and a mining town.

Prior to the founding of Vallenar in 1789 Freirina, then known as Santa Rosa, was the main town of Huasco Valley. The town was renamed to Freirina in honor of Supreme Director Ramón Freire in 1824 when it was raised in settlement category from asiento a villa.

From the 1930s to the 1950s there was significant gold mining in Capote 25 km north of Freirina. For much of the 19th centuiry and then again from 1952 to 1973 El Morado, 40 km south of Freirina, was an important copper mining center.

== Demographics ==
According to the 2002 census by the National Statistics Institute, Freirina had 5,666 inhabitants; of these, 3,469 (61.2%) lived in urban areas and 2,107 (38.8%) in rural areas. At that time, there were 2,800 men and 2,866 women. The population grew by 8.5% (445 persons) between the 1992 and 2002 censuses.

== Administration ==
As a commune, Freirina is a third-level administrative division of Chile administered by a municipal council, headed by an alcalde who is directly elected every four years. The 2008-2012 alcalde is Roberto Bruzzone Galeb.

Within the electoral divisions of Chile, Freirina is represented in the Chamber of Deputies by Mr. Alberto Robles (PRSD) and Mr. Giovanni Calderón (UDI) as part of the 6th electoral district, (together with Caldera, Tierra Amarilla, Vallenar, Huasco and Alto del Carmen). The commune is represented in the Senate by Isabel Allende Bussi (PS) and Baldo Prokurica Prokurica (RN) as part of the 3rd senatorial constituency (Atacama Region).

== Notable people ==
- Nicolasa Montt (1857-1924), poet
