= Caldera, Chile =

Caldera
- City and Commune
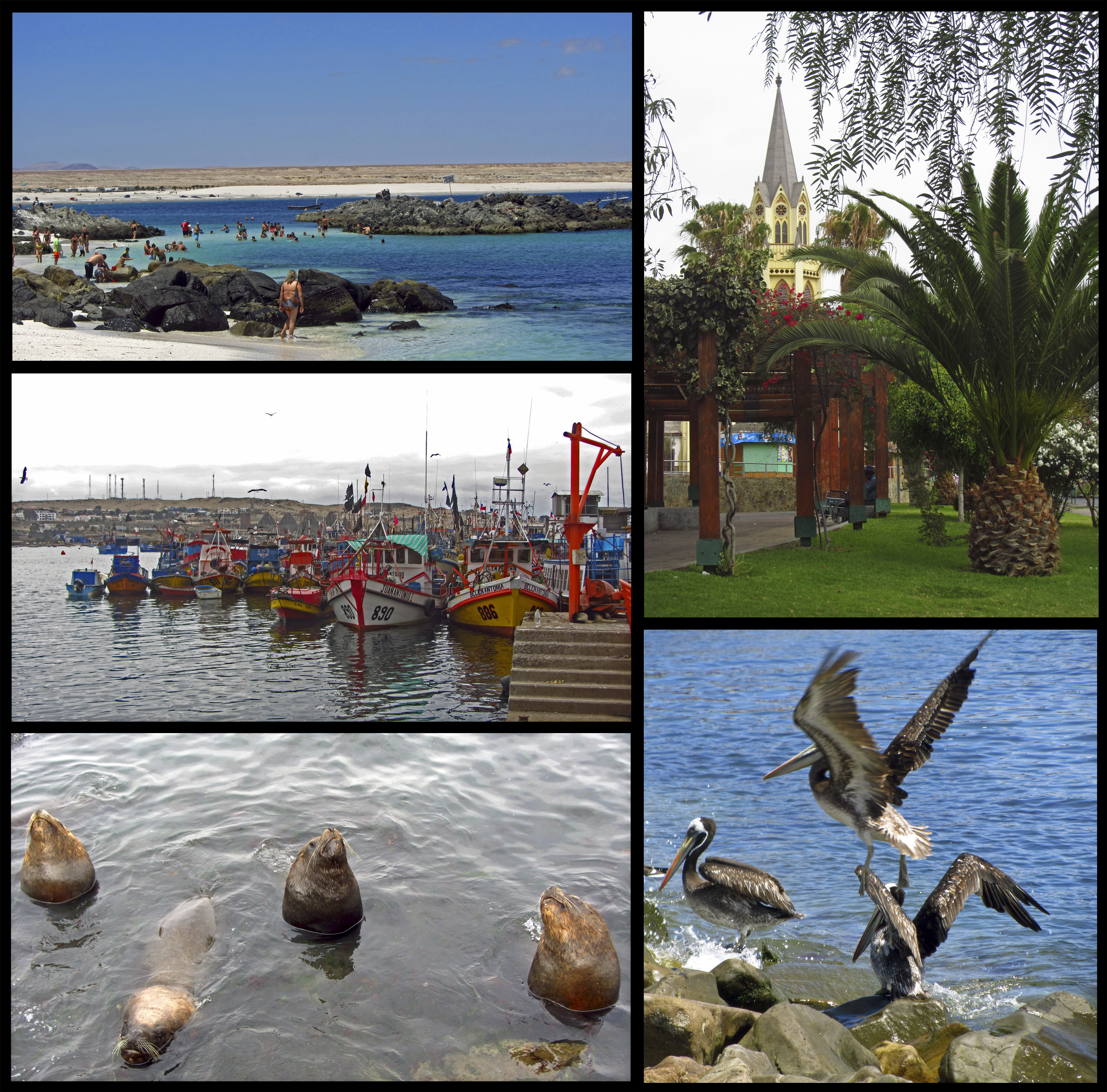
- Port of Caldera

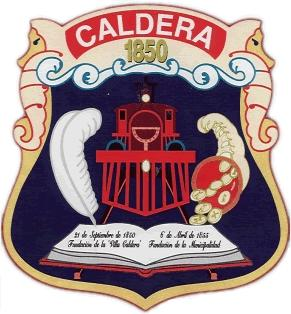
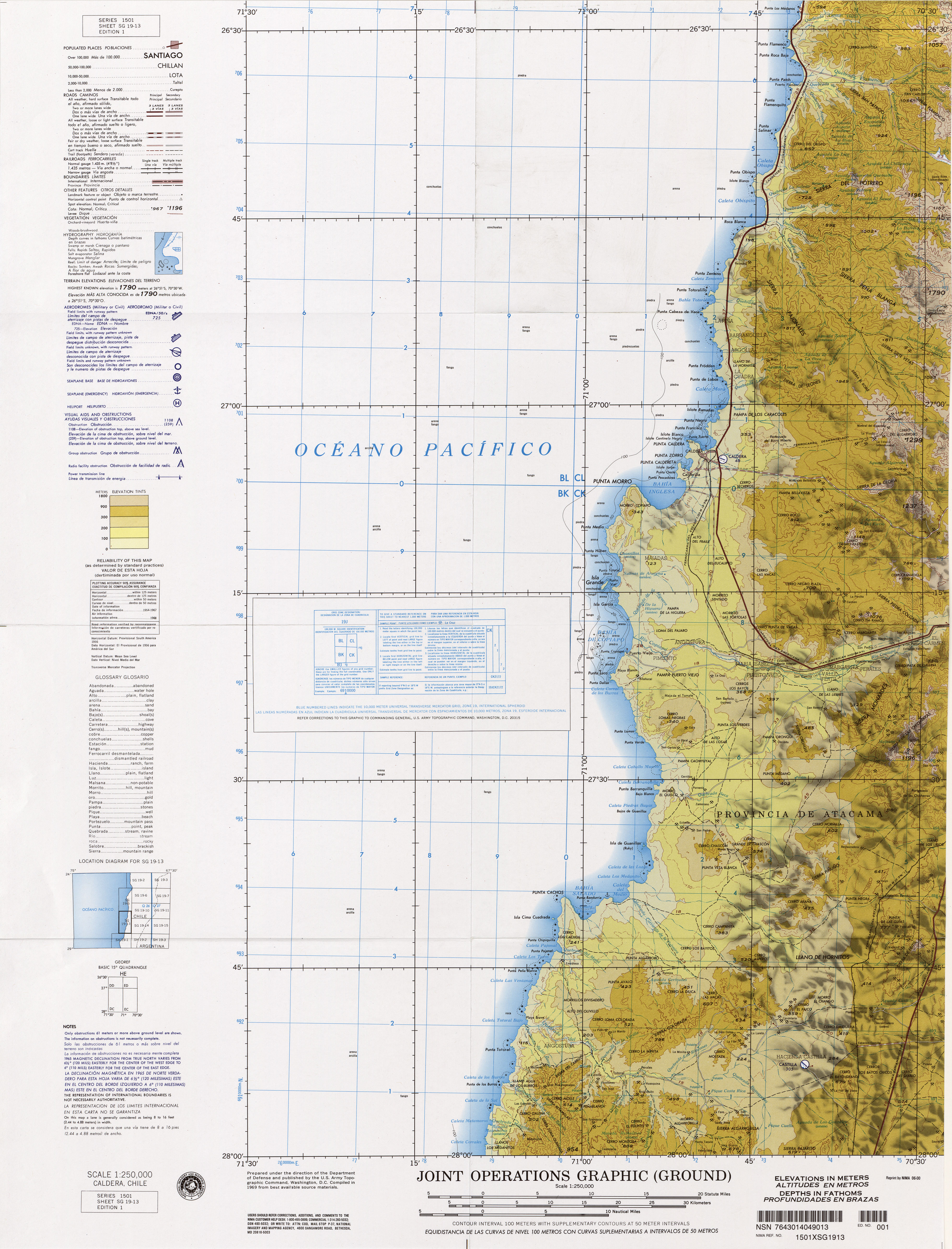
- Coat of arms Caldera's urban hinterland. Location in Chile
- Coordinates (city): 27°04′S 70°50′W
- Country: Chile
- Region: Atacama
- Province: Copiapó Province

Government
  - Type: Municipality
  - Alcalde: Brunilda González (PPD)

Area
  - Total: 4,666.6 km^{2} (1,801.8 sq mi)
- Elevation: 44 m (144 ft)

Population (2012 Census)
  - Total: 16,150
  - Density: 3.461/km^{2} (8.963/sq mi)
  - Urban: 13,540
  - Rural: 194

Sex
  - Men: 7,237
  - Women: 6,497
- Time zone: UTC−4 (CLT)
  - Summer (DST): UTC−3 (CLST)
- Area code: +56 52
- Website: Municipality of Caldera (in Spanish)

Caldera is a port city and commune in the Copiapó Province of the Atacama Region in northern Chile. It has a harbor protected by breakwaters, being the port city for the productive mining district centering on Copiapó to which it is connected by the first railroad constructed in Chile.

== Geography and climate ==
Caldera lies about 75 km (47 mi) west of Copiapó on the Pacific. The climate is mostly warm and extremely dry, because of its location on the Atacama desert's coast, but the temperatures are moderated by the cooling sea currents. However, lately the climate has become colder due to the climatic change. The commune spans an area of 4,666.6 km^{2} (1,802 sq mi).

Climate data for Caldera
Month	Jan	Feb	Mar	Apr	May	Jun	Jul	Aug	Sep	Oct	Nov	Dec	Year
Mean daily maximum °C (°F)	23.3 (73.9)	23.5 (74.3)	22.1 (71.8)	20.0 (68.0)	18.3 (64.9)	17.0 (62.6)	16.5 (61.7)	16.8 (62.2)	17.5 (63.5)	18.7 (65.7)	20.3 (68.5)	21.9 (71.4)	19.7 (67.4)
Daily mean °C (°F)	19.7 (67.5)	19.7 (67.5)	18.5 (65.3)	16.6 (61.9)	14.9 (58.8)	13.3 (55.9)	13.0 (55.4)	13.2 (55.8)	14.0 (57.2)	15.1 (59.2)	16.8 (62.2)	18.4 (65.1)	16.1 (61.0)
Mean daily minimum °C (°F)	16.2 (61.2)	16.3 (61.3)	15.2 (59.4)	13.6 (56.5)	11.9 (53.4)	10.0 (50.0)	9.8 (49.6)	10.0 (50.0)	10.8 (51.4)	12.0 (53.6)	13.4 (56.1)	15.0 (59.0)	12.9 (55.1)
Average precipitation mm (inches)	0.1 (0.00)	0.0 (0.0)	0.0 (0.0)	1.2 (0.05)	3.6 (0.14)	8.2 (0.32)	5.6 (0.22)	3.7 (0.15)	0.9 (0.04)	1.3 (0.05)	0.8 (0.03)	0.4 (0.02)	25.8 (1.02)
Average relative humidity (%)	76	77	79	80	82	82	82	81	81	80	78	77	80
Source: Bioclimatografia de Chile

== History ==
On 31 August 1420, the territory where the city is currently located, was shaken by an 8.8 to 9.4 mega-earthquake, the first major earthquake recorded in the history of Chile.

In 1687, Englishman Edward Davis reached the Playa Bahia Inglesa 6 km (4 mi) south of Caldera. In 1840, William Wheelwright of the Pacific Steam Navigation Company visited the region of Caldera. On his proposal the first railway was created in the year of 1851 from Caldera to Copiapó. Its inauguration was on Christmas Day in 1851. Caldera became an important port for the exportation of minerals. The city itself was officially founded on 23 September 1850.

Concurrent with a surge of copper mining in Chile a copper smelter was built in Caldera in 1853 and operated until about 1857. New copper smelters were built in the port in the 1880s and these were in operation until at least the 1920s before closure. Today, these smelters survive as ruins and are a site of study for industrial archaeology.

The city has been struck by earthquakes and tsunamis several times, the major ones being that of 13 August 1868, 9 May 1877 and 10 November 1922. During the 1891 Chilean Civil War, Caldera Bay outside the city became the site of the Battle of Caldera Bay where torpedo boats loyal to Manuel Balmaceda sunk the rebel ironclad Blanco Encalada.

== Demographics ==
In 1903, 2,130 people lived in Caldera. According to the 2002 census of the National Statistics Institute, Caldera had 13,734 inhabitants (7,237 men and 6,497 women). Of these, 13,540 (98.6%) lived in urban areas and 194 (1.4%) in rural areas. The population grew by 13.9% (1,673 persons) between the 1992 and 2002 censuses.

== Tourist attractions ==
=== Urban ===
- Former Railway Station: The first in Chile, its construction dates back to 1850, with the beginnings of the works for the railway Caldera–Copiapó, the first railway station in Chile and the third one in South America. It was designed to house a complete train in order to protect valuable minerals brought from Chañarcillo. The walls were made of mud and reeds from Guayaquil, with a wooden roof made of Oregon Pine. Inside it had a passenger platform and three load lines, all covered by a large shed 82 meters long by 32 meters wide.
- Church of San Vicente de Paul: Built in 1862 in wood with a stone floor and a Gothic wooden tower. Inside there is an image of the Virgin of Sorrows, brought from Peru as spoils of war after the military campaigns during the War of the Pacific.
- Cave of Padre Negro: A pilgrimage center built on a rock by the Colombian priest Crisógono Sierra y Velásquez, known locally as Padre Negro (Spanish for "Black Father"). Inside there are murals by the painter Luis Enrique Cerda.
- Municipal Cemetery of Caldera: The first secular cemetery in Chile, it was inaugurated on 20 September 1876. In its historical sector, mausoleums and tombs have cast iron structures made by English craftsmen and Carrara marble tombstones.
- Tornini House Museum: a private museum, opened on 5 November 2010. It houses historical artifacts relating to the city-port of Caldera, the Constitutional Revolution (1859), the War of the Pacific (1879-1883), and the Italian immigration in the late nineteenth century.
  The property was built around 1875 by the Railway Administration Manager, Thomas Smith, and later purchased by Henry B. Beazley, British Consul to Copiapó, Caldera and Peru. On 14 October 1907 it was acquired by Bernardo Tornini Capelli, serving for some years as viceconsular seat of the Kingdom of Italy.

=== Rural ===
- Orbicular Granite Nature Sanctuary: This geological oddity is located 11 km North of Caldera. It is a formation of a small area, about 400 m^{2}, with circular rock mineral scales on granite rocks, giving a peculiar appearance. Given the unusual nature the rock formation, it was declared a nature sanctuary in 1981 and is protected by conservation laws that apply to this type of landmark.
- Bahía Inglesa: A resort located a short distance from Caldera (6 km), with its name meaning "English Bay". With a population of 135 inhabitants (2002 census), it is named for the visit made by the English pirate Edward Davis. It is known particularly for its white sands and warm waters, in addition to good infrastructure for receiving both domestic and foreign visitors. There are camping facilities, hotels, restaurants and summer houses that can be rented on the spot. In the bay is an underwater museum.
- Playa La Virgen: A beach located 35 km south of Bahía Inglesa and 68 km west of Copiapó, which due to its white sand and warm waters has been considered the best beach in Chile for several years. Its name, meaning "Virgin Beach", is because on a road to the beach there is a rock which resembles the Virgin Mary. This beach has facilities for camping, parking, and has restaurants nearby.

== Economy ==
Mainstays of the economy are copper ore mining and cultivation of citrus plants which are exported from the port. Fishing and tourism also play an important role. The beaches attract many visitors.

The inland copper and gold mine of Candelaria uses the mechanized port of Punta Padrones in Caldera for its mineral export. The port was established in 1995.

== Administration ==
As a commune, Caldera is a third-level administrative division of Chile administered by a municipal council, headed by an alcalde (mayor) who is directly elected every four years. Since 2016 mayor is Brunilda González (PPD).

Within the electoral divisions of Chile, Caldera is represented in the Chamber of Deputies by Mr. Alberto Robles (PRSD) and Mrs. Yasna Provoste (DC) as part of the 6th electoral district, (together with Tierra Amarilla, Vallenar, Freirina, Huasco and Alto del Carmen). The commune is represented in the Senate by Isabel Allende Bussi (PS) and Baldo Prokurica Prokurica (RN) as part of the 3rd senatorial constituency (Atacama Region).

== Gallery ==
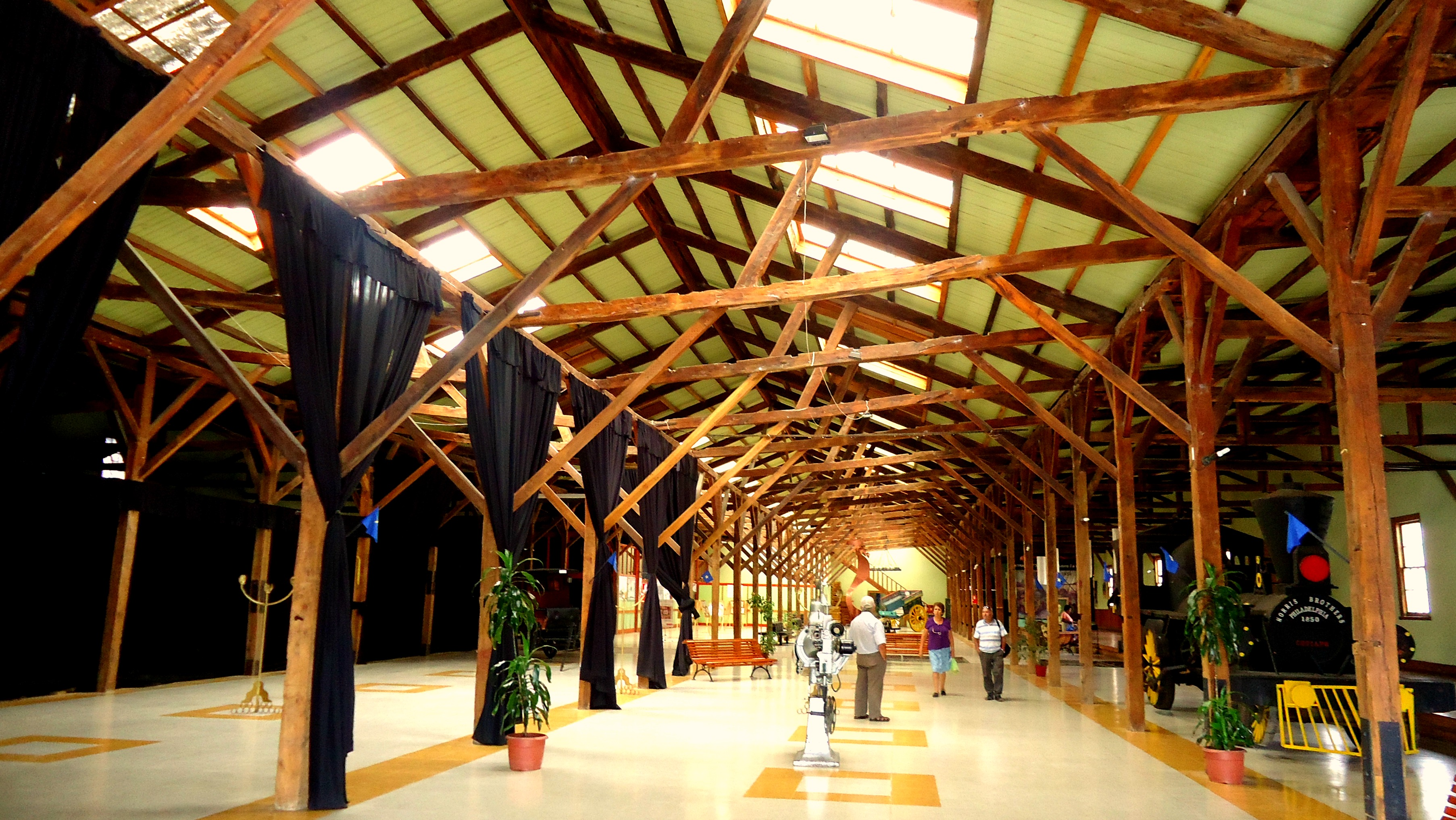
Inside of the Former Railway Station of Caldera.

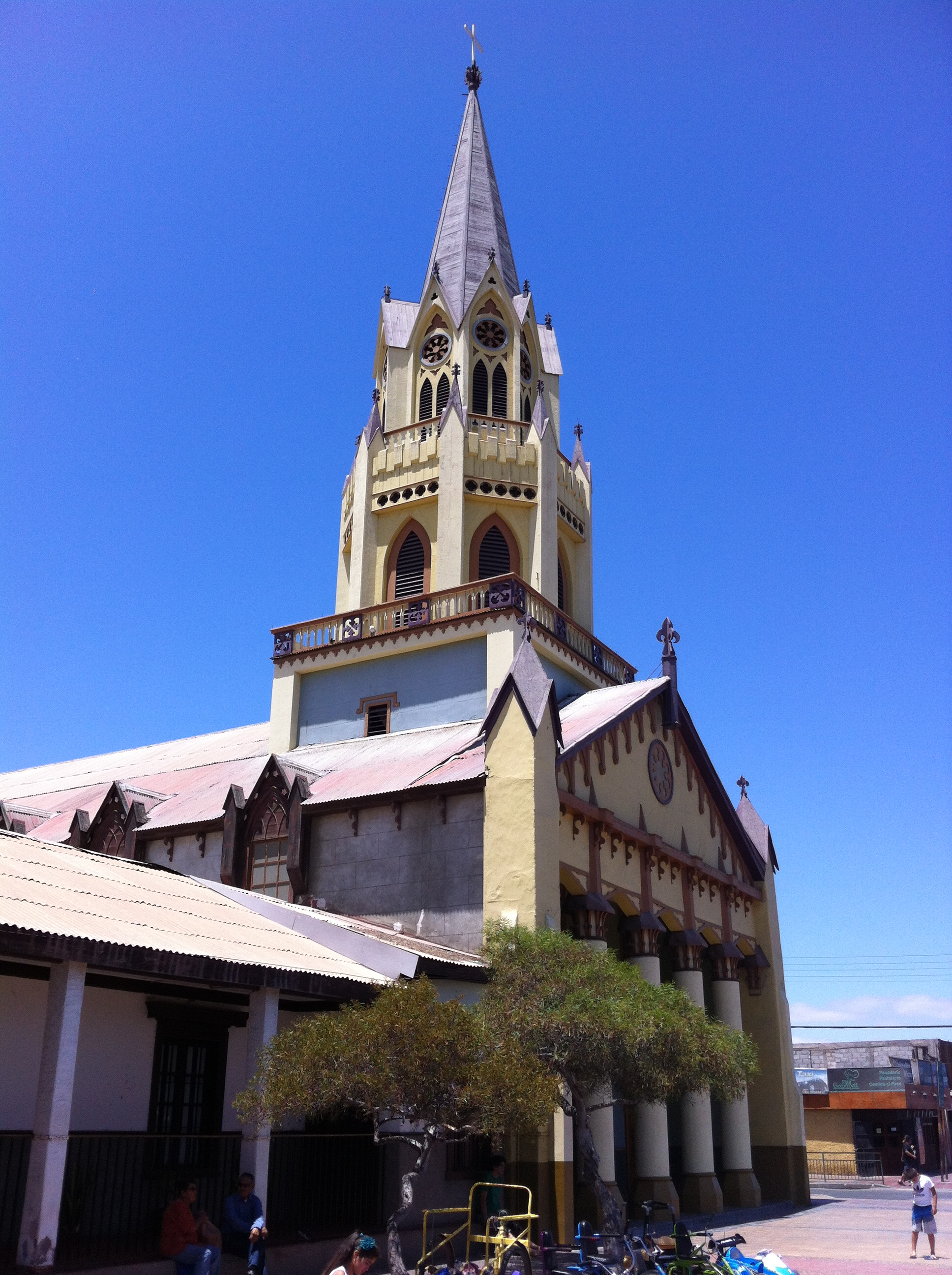
San Vicente de Paul Church.

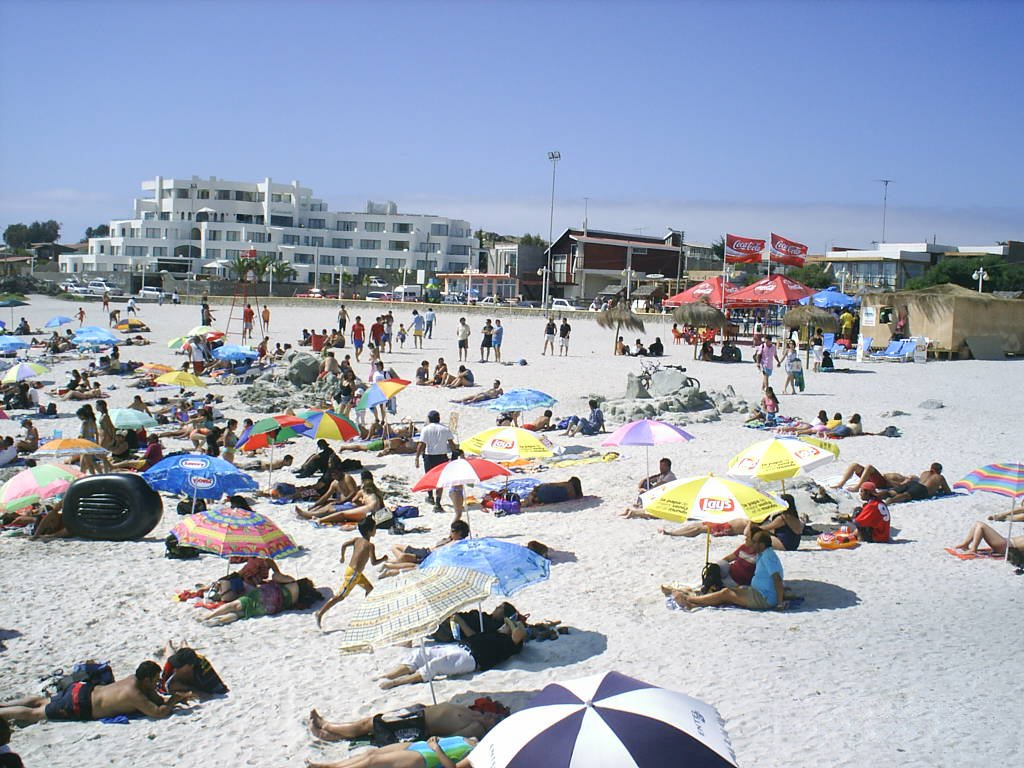
Bahía Inglesa.

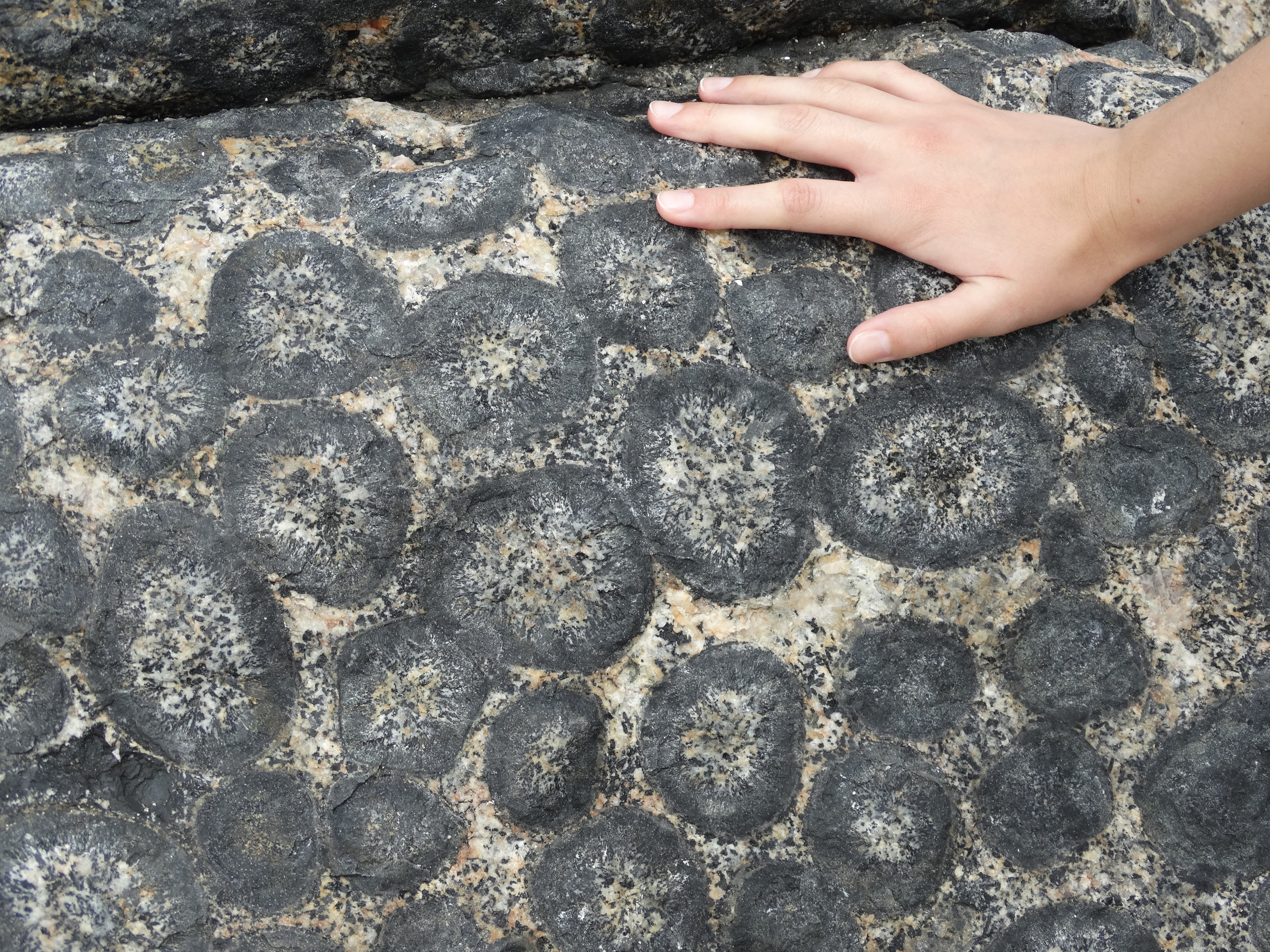
Orbicular granite from Orbicular Granite Nature Sanctuary.

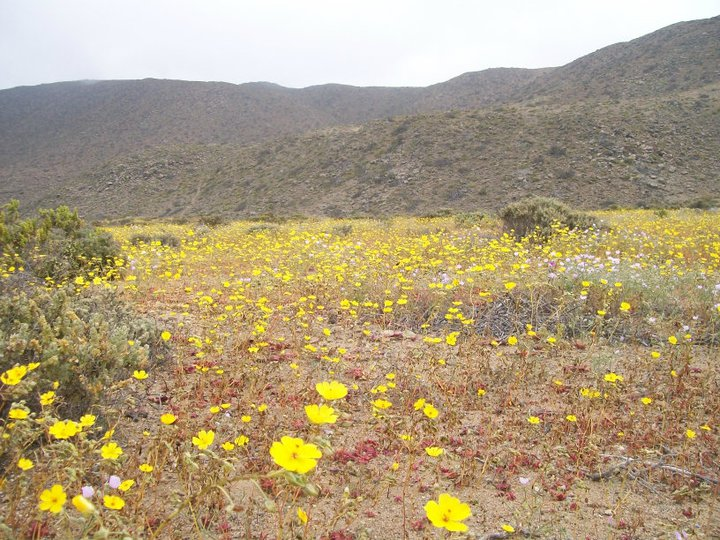
El Morro, Caldera, during the time of Desierto Florido (Spanish for blossoming desert).

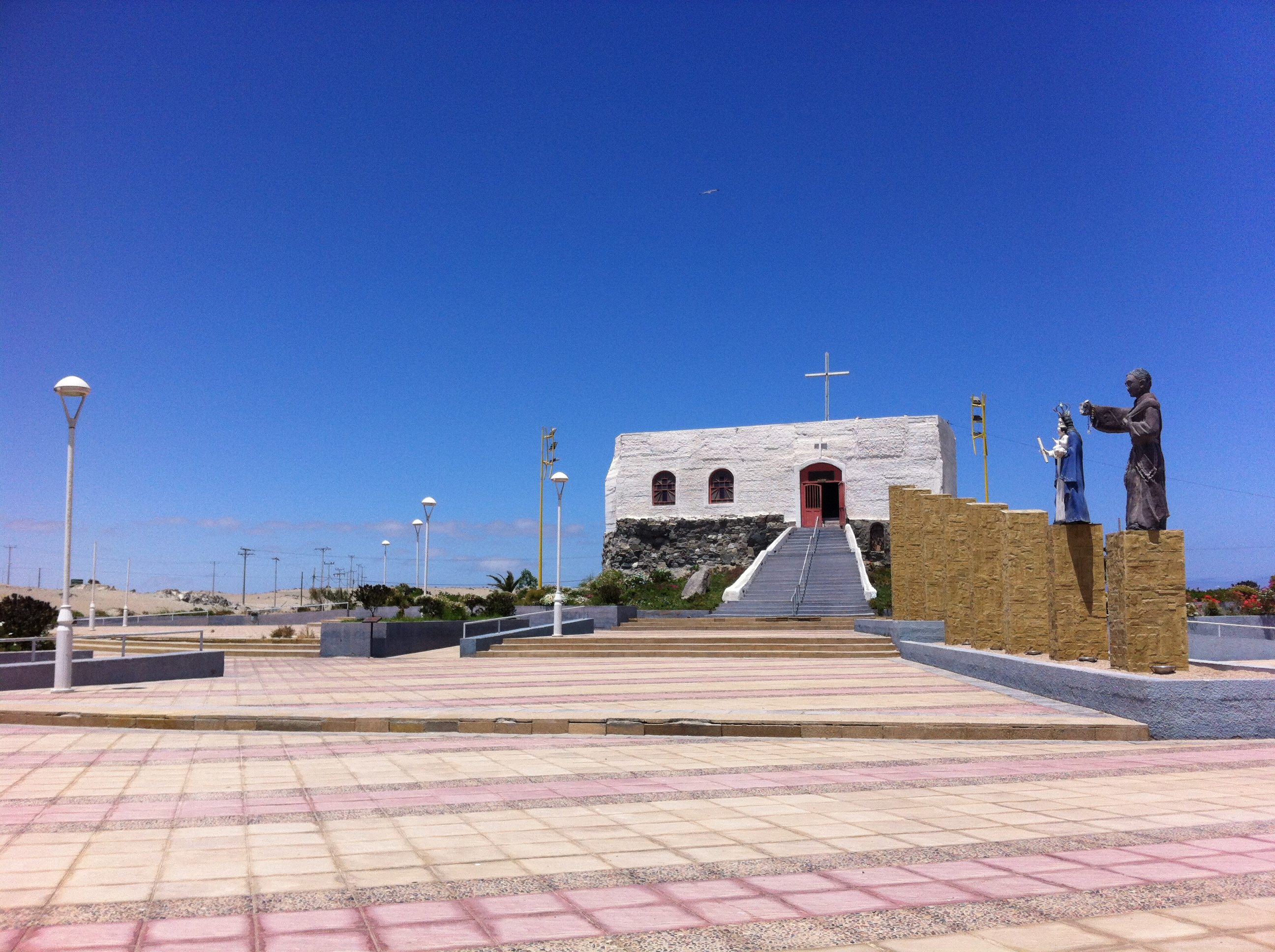
Cave of Padre Negro.

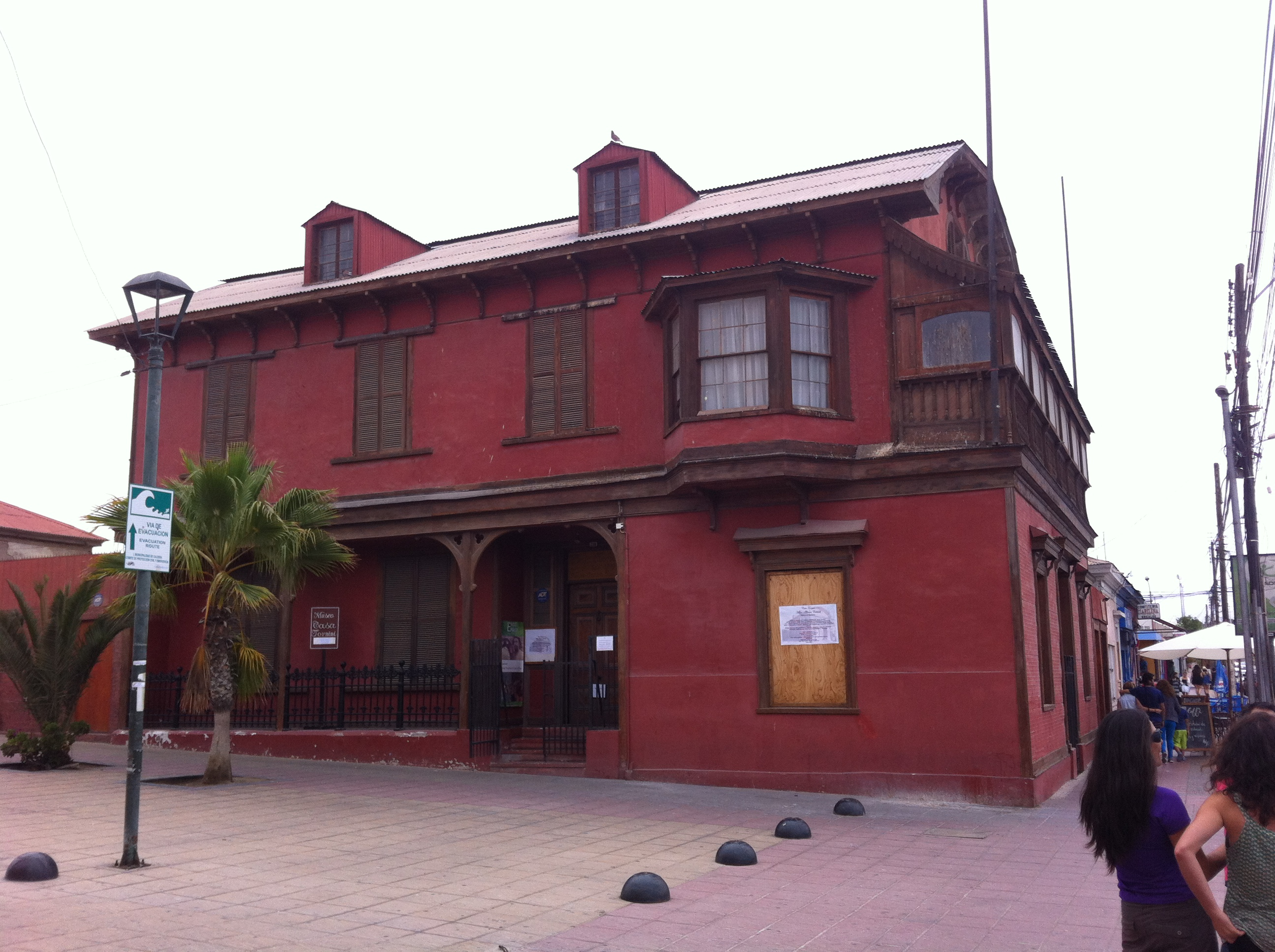
Tornini House Museum.

== Sister cities ==
- Lules, Argentina
- Villa Unión, Argentina
- General Lamadrid, Argentina
