= Flag of Atacama =

Atacama
- Use: Civil and state flag, civil ensign
- Proportion: 2:3
- Adopted: 1859; 167 years ago (Provisional Government of Atacama); February 1, 1996; 30 years ago (Atacama Region)

The flag of the Atacama Region of Chile is an old flag used by liberal rebel fraction during the Chilean Revolution of 1859. The design is a blue field with a yellow star in the center. The star and colours would originally represent the secularist-laicist and liberal ideology that was defended in the rebellion.

Before the Chilean Revolution, the Atacama Province, itself associated with mining, was in conflict with the agricultural provinces of the south. Atacama was the only province to be captured by rebels, who established a rival government, known for this reason as the Provisional Government of Atacama. This is not clear who was the creator of the flag, but is attributed to Pedro León Gallo Goyenechea, the leader of rebels.

This flag was readopted officially in 1997 by the Regional Government of Atacama. The regional flag must be hoisted on the building of the Regional Government and any other where he performs his duties, according to the regional rules.

== See also ==
- Flag of Chile
- Flag of Valdivia
