= Vallenar =

- City and Commune
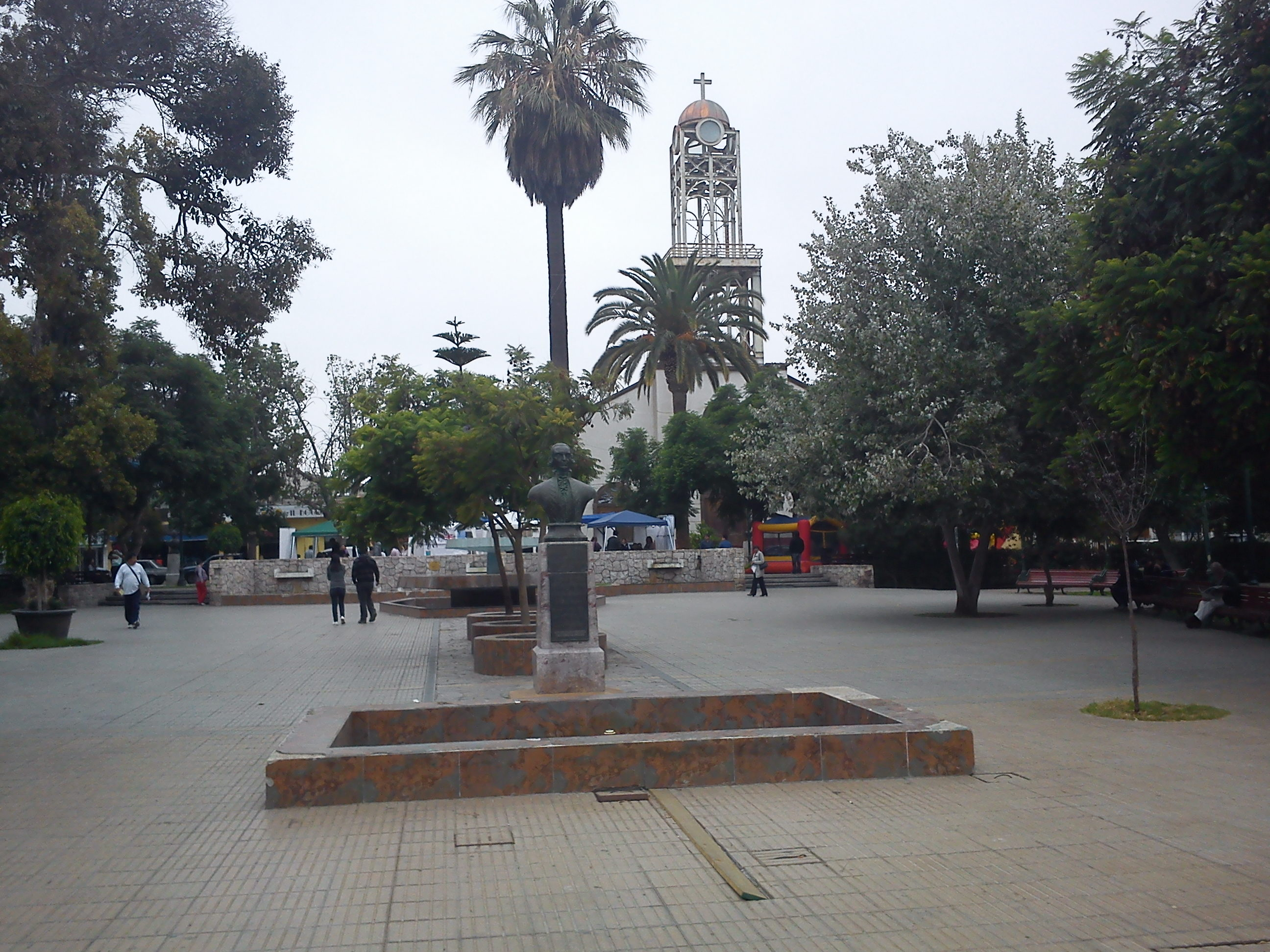

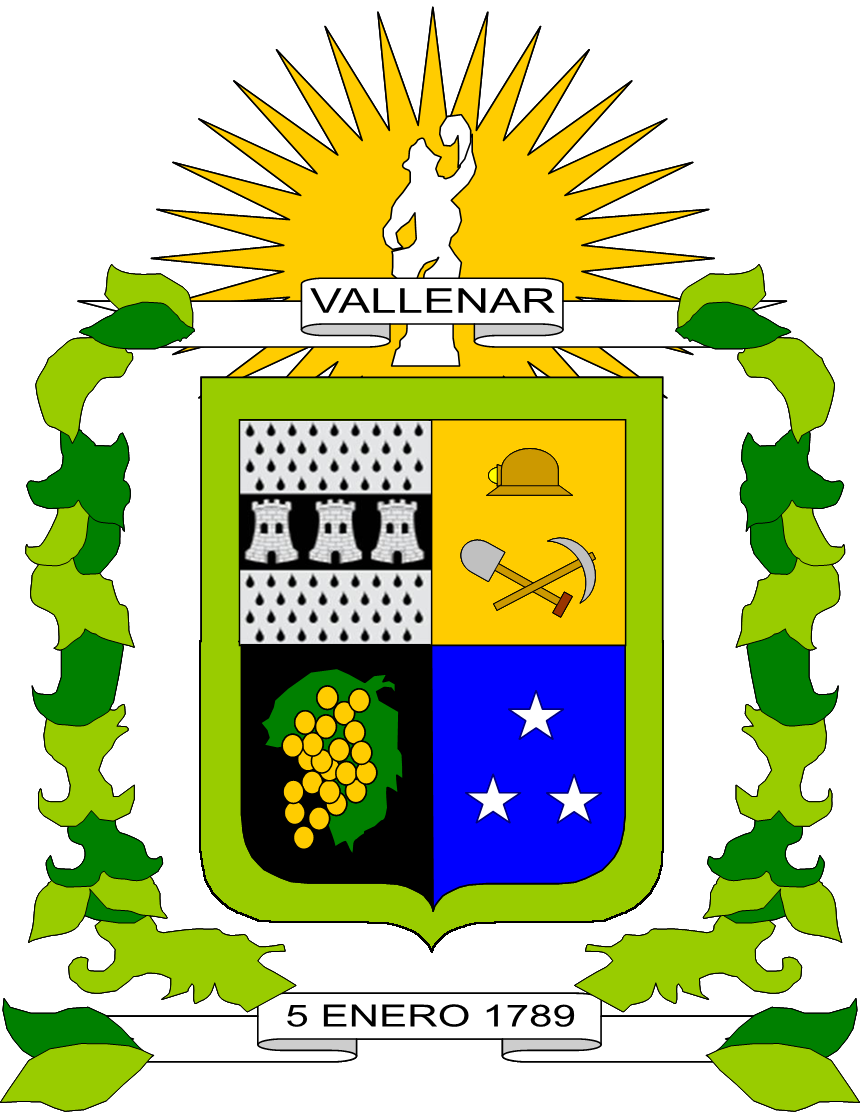
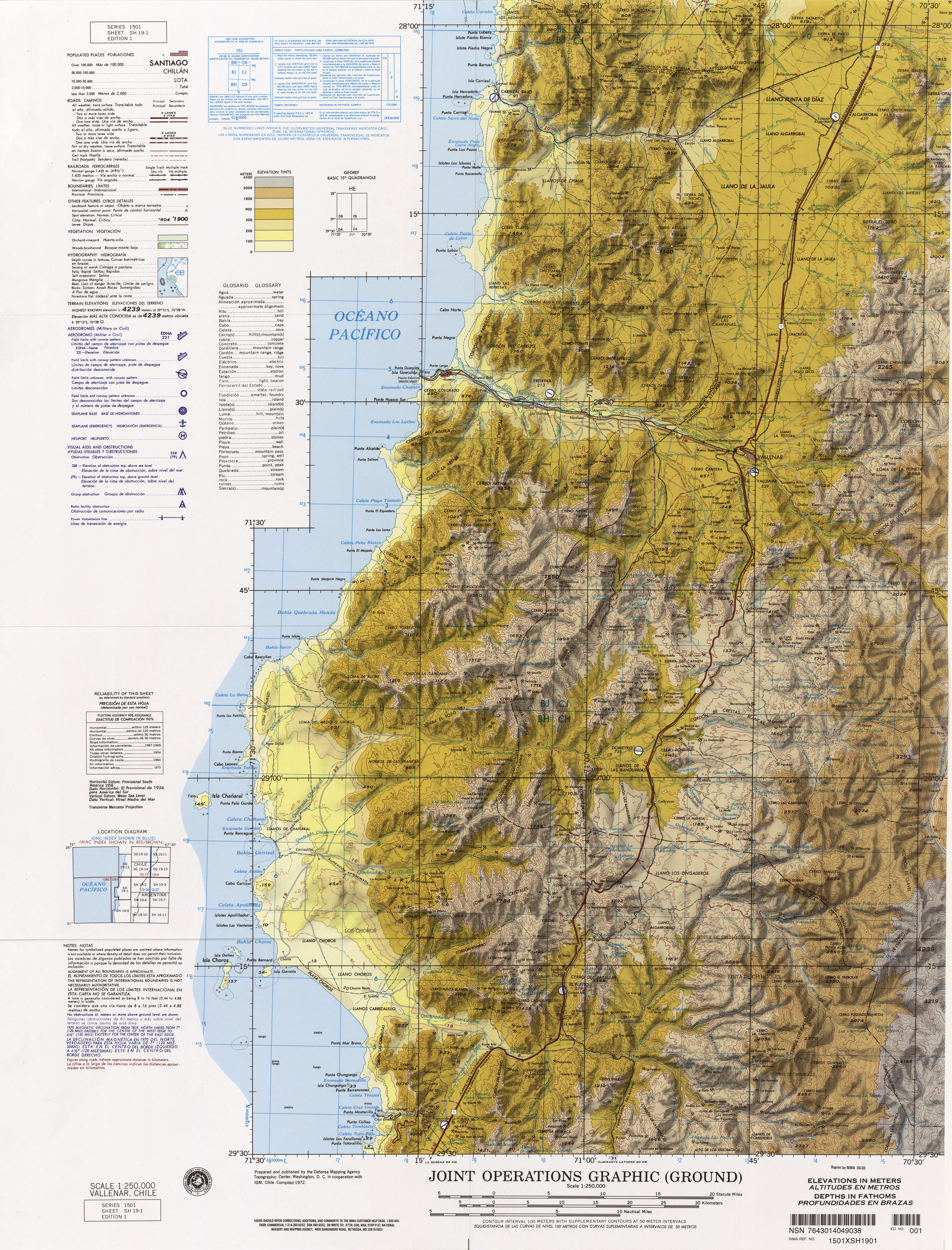
- Coat of arms Vallenar's urban hinterland Location in Chile
- Coordinates: 28°34′15″S 70°45′29″W
- Country: Chile
- Region: Atacama
- Province: Huasco
- Founded: 1789
- Founded as: San Ambrosio de Ballenary
- Founder: Ambrose O'Higgins

Government
  - Type: Municipality
  - Alcalde: Cristian Tapia Ramos

Area
  - Total: 7,083.7 km^{2} (2,735.0 sq mi)
- Elevation: 441 m (1,447 ft)

Population (2012 Census)
  - Total: 52,096
  - Density: 7.3543/km^{2} (19.048/sq mi)
  - Urban: 48,040
  - Rural: 4,290
- Demonym: Vallenarino

Sex
  - Men: 23,284
  - Women: 24,765
- Time zone: UTC−4 (CLT)
  - Summer (DST): UTC−3 (CLST)
- Area code: 56 + 51
- Website: Official website (in Spanish)

Vallenar is a city and commune in Atacama Region, Chile. It is the capital of the Huasco Province and is located in the valley of the Huasco River. Vallenar has 52,000 inhabitants. Its main activities are farming and mining. It was founded as San Ambrosio de Ballenary by Ambrose O'Higgins in 1789, after his birthplace in Ballynary in County Sligo, Ireland. With its founding Vallenar displaced Santa Rosa, now Freirina, as the main settlement of the Huasco Valley.

In 1922 a large earthquake devastated the city, destroying much of its older architecture.

Since the 1950s the city has been a service hub for iron mining in Chile with the city experiencing a significant economic upswing in the 1960s with the opening of the mine of El Algarrobo. Other iron mines near Los Colorados and Huantemé, but the wider Huasco basin hosts also mineral deposits of copper and gold.

The city lies next to the north-south Chile Route 5 highway which crosses through Huasco Bridge the river. The city lies downstream Santa Juana Dam built in the 1990s, and provides access to the inland commune of Alto del Carmen. Llanos de Challe National Park is located 60 km (37 mi) northwest of the city of Vallenar.

== Demographics ==
According to the 2002 census by the National Statistics Institute, Vallenar had 48,040 inhabitants (23,284 men and 24,756 women). Of these, 43,750 (91.1%) lived in urban areas and 4,290 (8.9%) in rural areas. The population grew by 1.7% (792 persons) between the 1992 and 2002 censuses.

== Administration ==
As a commune, Vallenar is a third-level administrative division of Chile administered by a municipal council, headed by an alcalde who is directly elected every four years. The 2008-2012 alcalde is Cristian Tapia Ramos.

Within the electoral divisions of Chile, Vallenar is represented in the Chamber of Deputies by Mr. Alberto Robles (PRSD) and Mr. Giovanni Calderón (UDI) as part of the 6th electoral district, (together with Caldera, Tierra Amarilla, Freirina, Huasco and Alto del Carmen). The commune is represented in the Senate by Isabel Allende Bussi (PS) and Baldo Prokurica Prokurica (RN) as part of the 3rd senatorial constituency (Atacama Region).

== Climate ==
Climate data for Vallenar
Month	Jan	Feb	Mar	Apr	May	Jun	Jul	Aug	Sep	Oct	Nov	Dec	Year
Mean daily maximum °C (°F)	26.6 (79.9)	26.7 (80.1)	25.3 (77.5)	22.7 (72.9)	20.6 (69.1)	18.9 (66.0)	18.8 (65.8)	19.8 (67.6)	21.0 (69.8)	22.7 (72.9)	24.1 (75.4)	25.5 (77.9)	22.7 (72.9)
Daily mean °C (°F)	18.6 (65.5)	18.6 (65.5)	17.1 (62.8)	14.9 (58.8)	13.1 (55.6)	11.7 (53.1)	11.4 (52.5)	12.2 (54.0)	13.0 (55.4)	14.5 (58.1)	15.6 (60.1)	17.5 (63.5)	14.9 (58.8)
Mean daily minimum °C (°F)	13.1 (55.6)	13.1 (55.6)	12.0 (53.6)	10.1 (50.2)	8.6 (47.5)	7.1 (44.8)	6.8 (44.2)	7.3 (45.1)	7.9 (46.2)	9.0 (48.2)	10.1 (50.2)	11.8 (53.2)	9.7 (49.5)
Average precipitation mm (inches)	0.0 (0.0)	0.0 (0.0)	0.7 (0.03)	1.3 (0.05)	4.1 (0.16)	3.2 (0.13)	11.9 (0.47)	7.1 (0.28)	2.1 (0.08)	1.2 (0.05)	0.0 (0.0)	0.0 (0.0)	31.6 (1.24)
Mean monthly sunshine hours	337.9	299.5	285.2	240.0	213.9	195.0	210.8	235.6	249.0	288.3	303.0	325.5	3,183.7
Mean daily sunshine hours	10.9	10.6	9.2	8.0	6.9	6.5	6.8	7.6	8.3	9.3	10.1	10.5	8.7
Source: Universidad de Chile

== Notable people ==
- Yasna Provoste
- Ricardo Francisco Rojas
