= Huasco Bridge =

- Coordinates: 28°34′5″S 70°47′0″W
- Crosses: Huasco River
- Locale: Vallenar
- Official name: Puente Huasco

History
- Opened: 1977

The Huasco Bridge (Spanish: Puente Huasco) is a bridge located in Vallenar, Chile, that crosses the Huasco River. The bridge is part of the Chile Route 5 and the Pan-American Highway. The planning of the bridge begun in 1964 when at a central level it was found that the newly established Chile Route 5 from Arica to Puerto Montt had a bottleneck in Vallenar. Construction begun in 1965. The bridge is notorious for its sudden collapse on May 9, 1967, when it was still under construction. The collapse killed 7 workers on the bridge and injured 10 to 20 more people, one of whom later died as result of his wounds. The dead workers were from Chamonate, Osorno and Ovalle. The causes of collapse remain unknown, but at the time of the collapse the constructing firm, Yaconi Hermanos, was using a building technique that was novel in Chile. Prior to the collapse workers had noted that the scaffold was unstable.

The bridge begun to be rebuilt in 1972 and opened to transit in 1977.
