= Del Tránsito River =

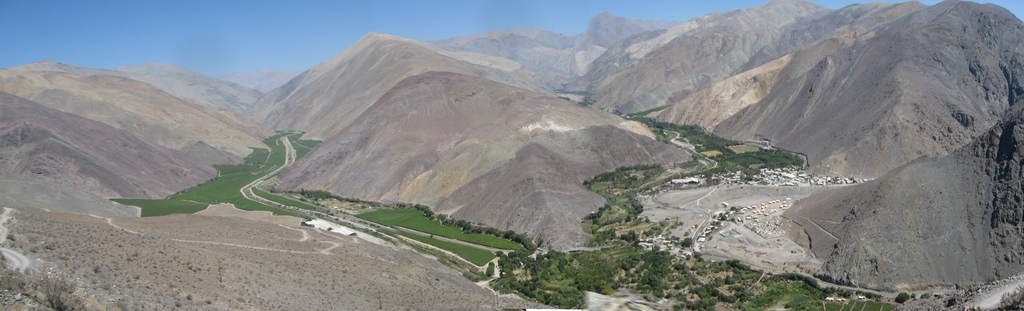
- Birth of Huasco River at the confluence of Del Tránsito River (left) and Del Carmen River (right)

Location
- Country: Chile

Physical characteristics
- Mouth: Huasco River
  - location: Alto del Carmen
  - coordinates: 28°45′07″S 70°29′06″W

The Del Tránsito River (Spanish: Río del Tránsito) is a water course in the Atacama Region, Chile.

== See also ==
- List of rivers of Chile
