= Pascua Lama =

Open pit mining project in the Andes mountains, Argentina and Chile

Coordinates: 29°19′23″S 70°01′24″W

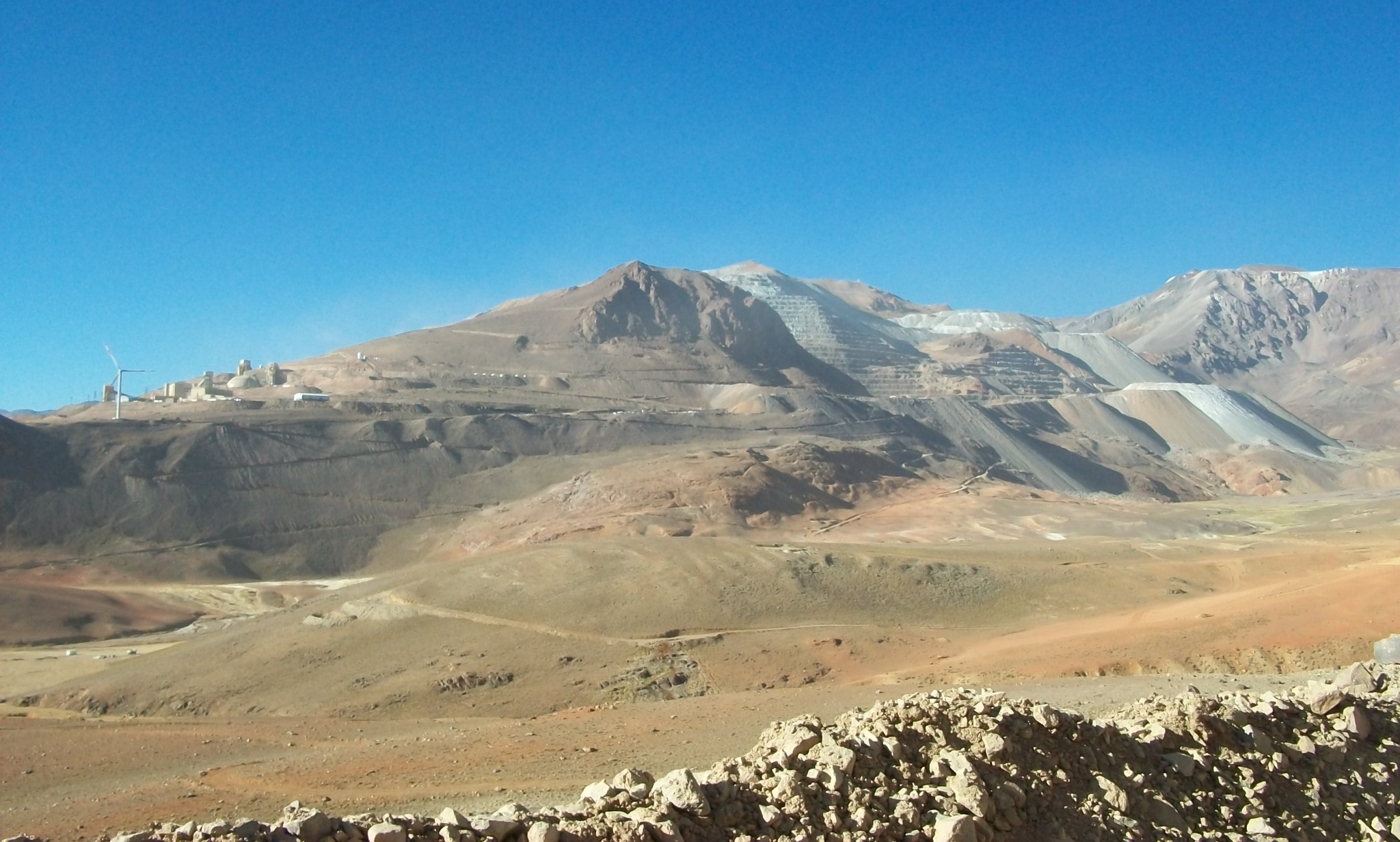
Barrick Pascua Lama project area, 2010

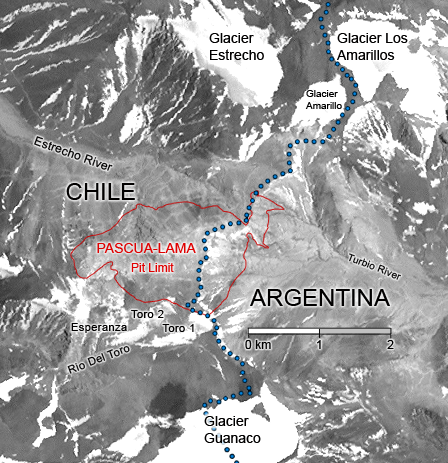
Satellite view of the project area showing the proposed Pascua-Lama open pit in red

Pascua-Lama is an open pit mining project of gold, silver, copper and other minerals. Pascua Lama is located in the Andes mountains, in the southern reaches of Atacama Desert, straddling the border between Chile and northwest Argentina at an altitude of over 4,500 m (14,800 ft) Toronto-based Barrick Gold, the world's largest gold mining company, holds rights to the project. Due to its proximity to glaciers, Pascua-Lama has caused controversy and public protest in Chile, including demonstrations and petitions presented to the Chilean government. Chile has not approved the project.

== Location and geology ==
The deposit lies at an elevation of 5,000 m (16,000 ft) in the Andes, at the northern end of the El Indio Gold Belt of Chile and Argentina.

The mineralisation is primarily hosted in fracture networks and breccias of Miocene age, which were created by phreatomagmatic activity, and cut granitic rocks of Triassic age. The alunite-pyrite-enargite mineral assemblage indicates a high-sulfidation epithermal origin.

== Barrick Gold's mining project ==
Pascua-Lama contains estimated deposits of 17 million ounces of gold and 635 million ounces of silver, with 75 percent of the deposits in Chile and 25 percent in Argentina.

The Barrick Gold company reported a U$5.1-billion impairment charge on the asset before suspending development in late 2013. Barrick had spent around US$5 billion of Pascua-Lama's reported US$8.5 billion capital expenditure at that time. Barrick said it was taking a "fresh look" at Pascua-Lama with the intention of developing a "scalable starter operation" that could be built underground in Argentina. The company was expected to release a prefeasibility study on the new plan by early 2018.

On 17 September 2020, the First Environmental Court fined Barrack US$9.7 million and charged them with 33 offences, including the contamination of the Estrecho River without notifying the locals about the impact of the project on the Andean glaciers. The court further ordered the complete closure of the project.

== Legal background ==
There is a long-running Court action (Action No. C-1912-2001) in Chile found on the Court's website, initiated in 2001 by Mr. Villar (a professional mining agent representing miner Jorge R. Lopehandia), regarding mining rights for an 8,400-hectare plot of land in Chile, 3,400 hectares of which lie superimposed with two other claims, with one of which, "Los Amarillos 1-3000", allows mining of salts and nitrates only, and the other, Tesoro, was filed by Barrick's mining agent atop both of the Los Amarillos 1-3000 claims and the Amarillo Sur claims obtained by Barrick in the referenced Court-disputed transaction involving a purchase price of $20. All of these Claims are located superimposed partially over Barrick's Pascua Lama mine. Barrick contends the Claims dispute involves the scenario where "The lone road to Barrick's Pascua Lama mine snakes through Mr. Villar's claim, however even if Barrick doesn't win the appeal against Mr. Villar, Barrick can still continue to use this road to as Mr. Villar would only control mining rights to the disputed territory, not surface rights." The Court case is now moving to a final conclusion at the Supreme Court level in Santiago's 14th District Court, which is hearing evidence of Barrick's connection with the registered owner of the Tesoro Claims, Hector Unda Llanos. Unda Llanos has sworn opposing statements to the Chilean Courts, variously, that he has no connection to Barrick nor its subsidiaries, and also, in a separate but related Court Case in Chile, that he is Barrick's employee. These opposing statements were sworn to the Court ostensibly to suit Unda Llanos' needs at the time, to benefit Barrick's position in these two Court cases, brought by or on behalf of Jorge R. Lopehandia. Barrick has consistently represented that it owns all Claims in the Pascua project area but does not divulge that Unda Llanos (not Barrick) owns the Tesoro Claims, which Claims have been under injunction since Action No. C-1912-2001 was filed in the 14th Civil Court of Santiago.

Barrick found it necessary to order its mining agent, Unda Llanos, to file the Tesoro Claims over top of the Amarillo Sur Claims.

Curious, since Barrick asserts that its underlying (its oldest Pascua Claim, obtained from Lac Minerals Ltd. in 1994) Los Amarillos 1-3000 Claims do in fact support metallic mining, and not just salts and nitrates, one must logically question Barrick's assertion; why would Barrick need a superimposed Claim (Tesoro) that does support metallic mining? How can Barrick lawfully assert (and the Provincial Securities Commissions lawfully maintain) in its Pascua-Lama Technical Reports that: "In both Chile and Argentina, Barrick, through its wholly owned Argentinean subsidiary, Barrick Exploraciones S.A., and its wholly owned Chilean subsidiary, Compañia Minera Nevada SpA, owns the mining property in the project area.", since the Unda Llanos-owned Tesoro Claims are under a Court Injunction preventing their exploitation in any manner.

[Chile is a "Napoleonic Code" jurisdiction, similar to France and Quebec, and its system of law varies from that in England, Canada and the United States ("Common law" jurisdictions). Accordingly, its Court procedure is considerably different than that of Common law jurisdictions.]

The project formerly became possible with the adoption by Chile and Argentina of the Mining Integration and Complementation Treaty, signed by the presidents of Chile and Argentina in 1997 and ratified by their legislatures in 2000. This treaty permits investors to explore and exploit mineral deposits that straddle the border between the two countries. In 2000, an appeal was filed with the Chilean Constitutional Court to rule the treaty unconstitutional. Alcayaga, Luna, and Padilla, analyzing the treaty, have concluded that, "both in terms of content and form, [it] contains provisions that violate Chile's constitution". Nevertheless, nothing came of the lawsuit, and Chile's National Environmental Commission (CONAMA) issued its final approval for the Pascua Lama project on 13 June 2006.

== History of the project ==
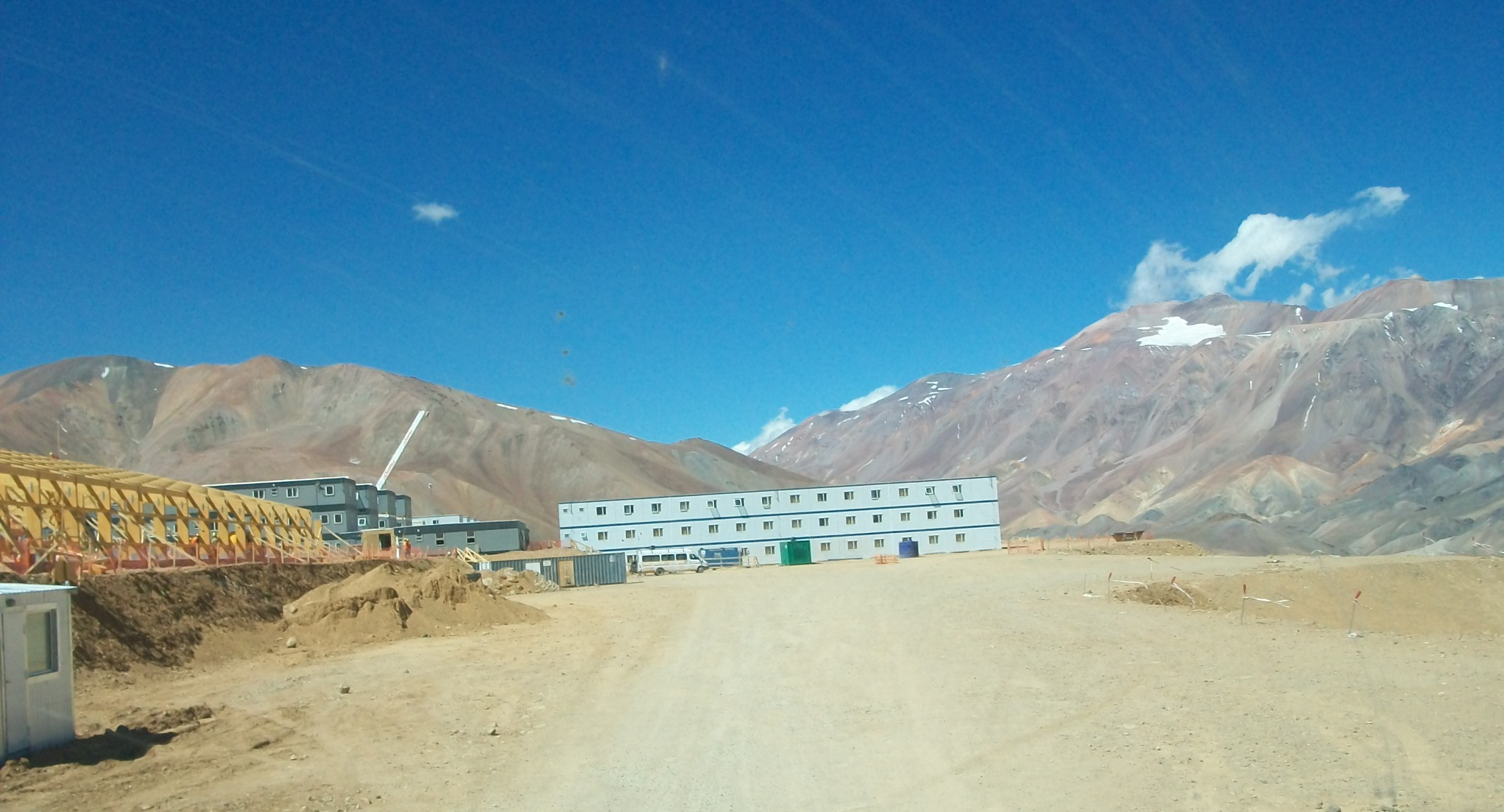
Pascua Lama accommodation blocks under construction, 2010

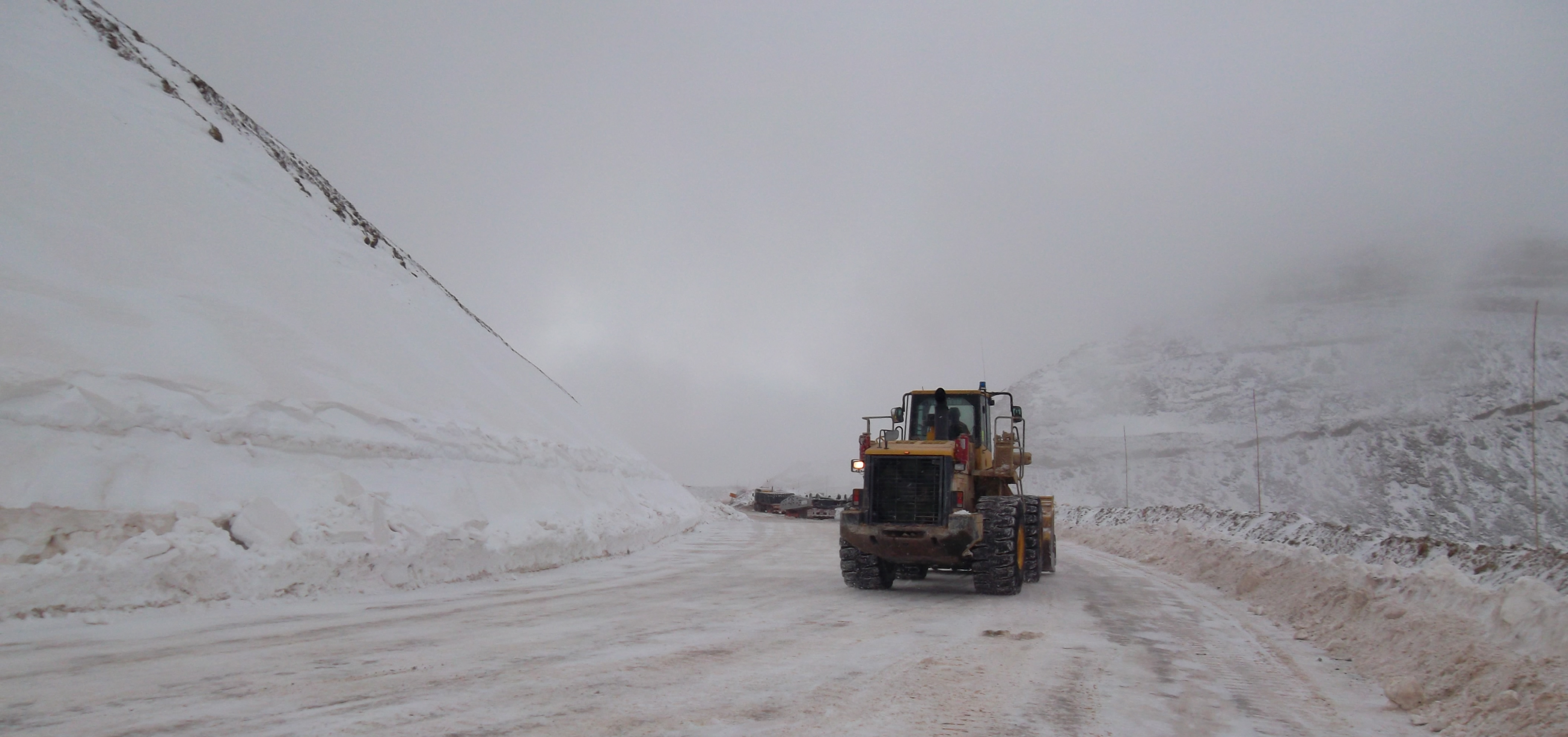
Road maintenance at Pascua Lama, May 2012

The mining project is organized by the Barrick Gold corporation, which planned in 2006 to invest US$1.5 billion over 20 years in it and projects an annual output of 750,000 ounces of gold and 30 million ounces of silver in the first five years.

Barrick has been planning the project for several years. It performed its first studies of the glaciers in 1991, purchased the Chañarcillo estate at the location via an affiliate (Empresa Nevada) in 1997, and published an environmental impact report in 2000, which was approved by COREMA, the regional environment authority, in 2001.

Barrick's plans for the project have changed over time. In June 2005, Barrick intended to commence building in January 2006, after responding to a questionnaire put to it by CONAMA, Chile's National Environmental Commission. In November 2005, however, the company published a report stating that it had scrapped its original plans, presented in December 2004, for "transplanting" three glaciers in order to gain access to the deposits beneath them, moving them to another glacier with which they were to bond. This change was publicly supported by Fernando González, the chairman of the council of Huasco Valley farmers. In 2013, the Argentine non-profit environmental organization, CEDHA published a report entitled, "Barrick's Glaciers", claiming that Barrick failed to report or conduct studies on hundreds of glaciers in Pascua Lama's project area. Another report by the same organization also focused on glacier impacts by Barrick Gold to the lands belonging to the Diguita Huascoaltino community in Chile.

In November 2011, CEDHA filed an Equator Principles Due Diligence Review to two public banks, EDC of Canada and the US EXIM Bank of the United States, claiming Barrick Gold was violating a long list of due diligence obligations regarding environmental safety and protection. The banks were set to provide Barrick Gold with significant start up loans for the project, supposed to start in 2012. Other environmental organizations in Canada, Chile and Argentina were also providing information to the banks, discouraging financing to Barrick for Pascua Lama. In March 2012, both EDC and Exim Bank announced that the Barrick deal had fallen through. These banks were not prepared to provide the critical start up financing for Pascua Lama, estimated to be in the neighborhood of US$500 million, and soon after that news Barrick Gold announced extended delays in launching Pascua Lama.

In 2012, in the context of the costs of water usage in mining globally, Barrick's escalating costs for the Pascua Lama mine were reviewed. "As of November 1, 2012, Barrick had spent $3.7 billion on Pascua Lama. In all, it plans to invest between $8 and $8.5 billion to bring the project into production. But if the past is any guide, those costs could rise: the company's budget was just $3 billion in 2009".

An environmental acid rock drainage (ARD) baseline report was submitted in 1999. Report authors noted the importance of agriculture of the Huasco valley, whose river and tributaries are glacier fed. Three surface water courses drain the Pascua Mine hill, the Rio Del Estrecho on the northwest side, Rio El Toro on the southwest side, and Arroyo Turbio on the east side. The continental divide of South America separates these rivers. The rivers fed by the Arroyo Turbio do not reach the Atlantic. Rio Del Estrecho and Rio El Toro flow into the Rio Huasco valley and empties into the Pacific.

== Environmental consequences controversy ==
Those protesting the project contend that it will involve the removal of 20 hectares of ice, a volume of 300,000 to 800,000 cubic metres, and that this will cause serious environmental harm. Nevertheless, the EIA and IIA approvals in both Chile and Argentina specifically preclude this from happening, and Barrick has confirmed it has no plans to move any ice or glaciers. To do so would be a violation of the permits granted by the relevant authorities. Opponents also contend that the project will affect the water supply of the 70,000 farmers in the Huasco valley, releasing cyanide, sulfuric acid (vitriol) and mercury into the valley's rivers (this is however, a misleading statement, as the processing plant, which such chemicals are used or generated, is on the Argentinian side of the mountain), that the company has bought the support of the farmers with "social assistance" and promises of US$60 million for infrastructure work, and that the Mining Integration and Complementation Treaty was adopted under pressure from Barrick. In November 2005, a petition of 18,000 signatures was presented to the Chilean government by the Anti Pascua Lama Front, a coalition of environmentalist groups.

The original scope of the ore body lay partially under two small glaciers which eventually feed into the rivers of the Huasco Province. Environmental reviews took place over more than two years and government authorities imposed 400 conditions on the company in order to mine. As a consequence, more than one million ounces of gold at the site will not be mined.

The historical record of these types of projects in Chile and the companies' real-world ability to meet legal environmental constraints makes the processing of residual-waste a point of contention. The inability or unwillingness of local authorities to stand up to spills and breaches of environmental requirements is well known and another key point of disagreement with opponents to the project.

The recent approval (as of 2000–2009, during the Lagos and Bachelet presidencies) of many controversial projects such as large mines, dams for power generation, huge salmon farms, forestry, etc. in spite of many legal and environmental concerns, again question the ability or willingness of the Chilean Government to address local communities' concerns' when clashing with large corporations and perceived economic benefits.

These issues have recently even been criticized by the OECD as major impediments for Chile being able to join the 'elite club' of developed countries.

Barrick Gold contends that the project is environmentally friendly in terms of water treatment, and that the project will create 5,500 direct jobs during the mine's construction phase. It contends that underground mining methods are not economically feasible for the mine, only open pit methods. It states that its US$1.5 billion investment "would be directly invested in the Huasco province in Chile and San Juan province in Argentina", that it has "identified more than 600 potential suppliers from Chile’s Region III" in pursuance of its policy of sourcing local goods and services, and that "sustainable development projects have been and will continue to be a priority for funding to the tune of millions of dollars focused in the areas of education, health, infrastructure and agricultural improvement".

== Electronic mail chain letter ==
This project was in 2006 the subject of an online petition, circulating as a chain letter by electronic mail, imploring the Chilean government to prevent the project from obtaining authorization because of the environmental and social consequences of the mining operation. According to analysis by Snopes, the main point of the petition was valid, but it did contain some misleading passages. Barrick published a response countering many of the statements made in the chain letter.

== Status of the Barrick Project, 2013-2024 ==
The project was put on hold in 2013 due to environmental issues, political opposition, labor unrest, and cost overruns. In 2018, Chile's environmental court ordered the closure of the Chilean side of the project.

Barrick Gold plans to spend $US 136 million to close its failed Pascua-Lama gold-silver project in Chile, straddling the border with Argentina. The company was fined $US 11.5 million by Chile's environmental court in 2020.

== See also ==
- Canadian mining in Latin America and the Caribbean
- Gold mining in Chile
