= Del Carmen River =

River in Chile

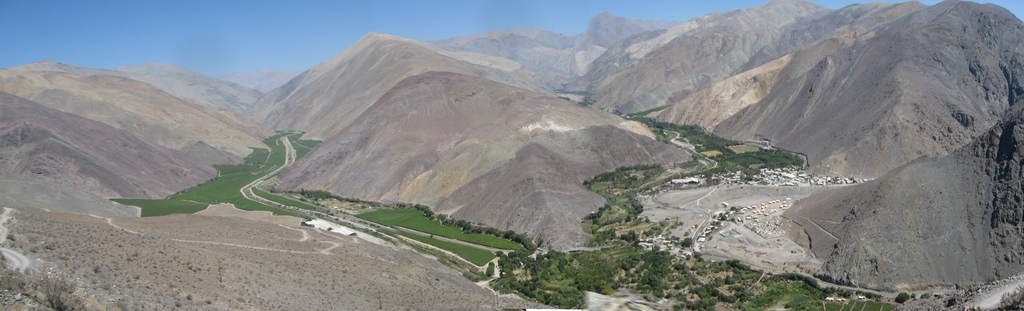
- Birth of Huasco River at the confluence of Del Tránsito River (left) and Del Carmen River (right)

Location
- Country: Chile

Physical characteristics
- Source
  - location: Andes
- Mouth
  - location: Huasco River

The Del Carmen River (Spanish: Río del Carmen) is the river of Chile. Its tributaries are:

- El Toro River
- Socarrón River
- Sancarrón River
- Del Medio River
- Primero River (Huasco)

== See also ==
- List of rivers of Chile
