= Huasco =

- City and Commune
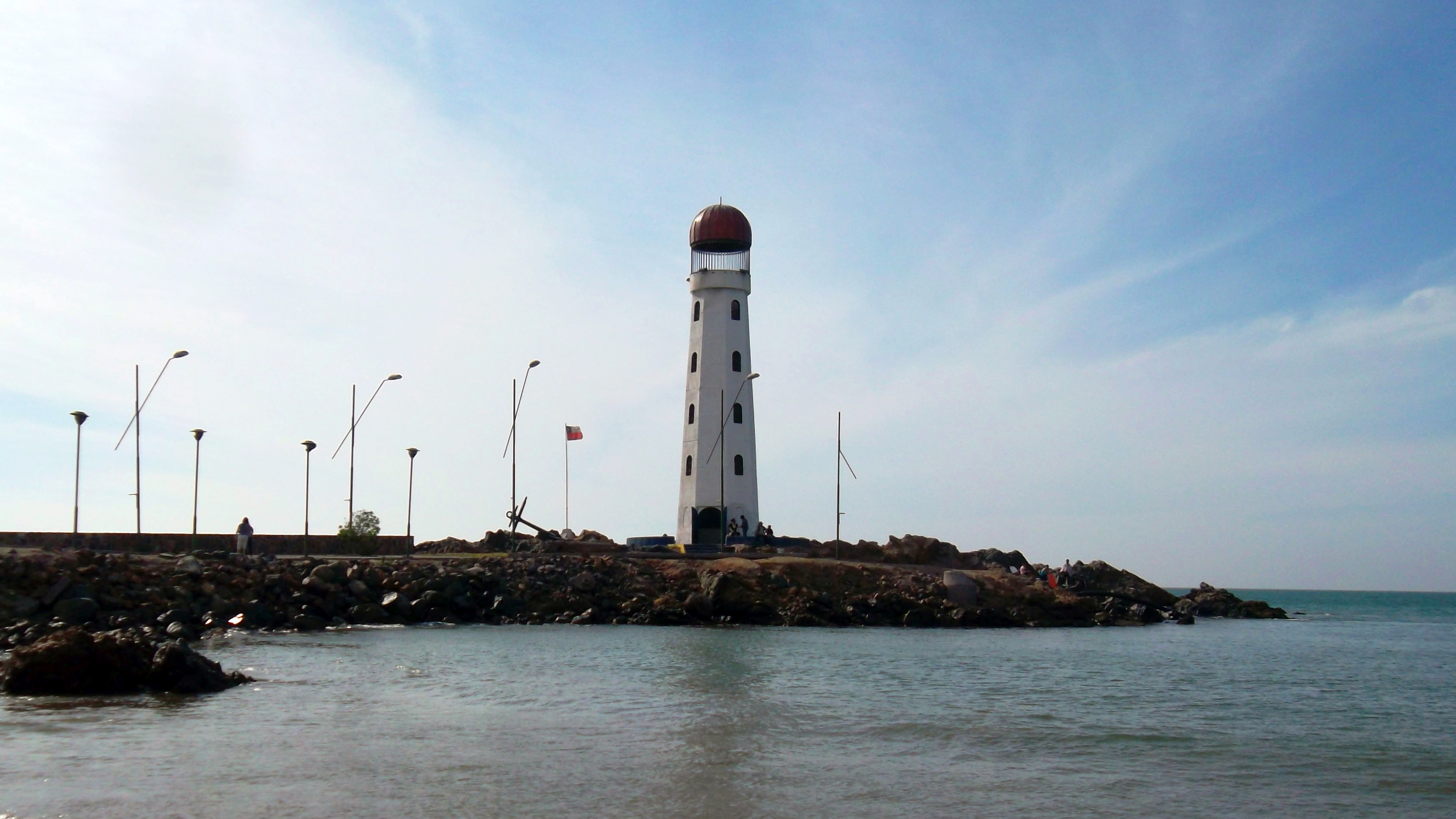

- Flag Coat of arms Location in Chile
- Coordinates: 28°27′59″S 71°13′09″W
- Country: Chile
- Region: Atacama
- Province: Huasco

Government
  - Type: Municipality
  - Alcalde: Rodrigo Loyola Morenilla

Area
  - Total: 1,601.4 km^{2} (618.3 sq mi)
- Elevation: 30 m (98 ft)

Population (2012 Census)
  - Total: 8,977
  - Density: 5.606/km^{2} (14.52/sq mi)
  - Urban: 6,445
  - Rural: 1,500

Sex
  - Men: 3,999
  - Women: 3,946
- Time zone: UTC−4 (CLT)
  - Summer (DST): UTC−3 (CLST)
- Area code: (+56) 51
- Climate: BWh
- Website: www.imhuasco.cl

Huasco (Spanish pronunciation: [ˈwasko]) is a Chilean city and commune, in the Huasco Province, Atacama Region. It is the central town of a mining district dominated by medium-scale mining.

The port city of Huasco is located 50 km west of Vallenar and close to the town of Huasco Bajo, which lies on the southern bank of the Huasco River and only a few kilometers from its mouth. The coastal route between Huasco Bajo and Carrizal Bajo provides one of the two accesses to Llanos de Challe National Park. To the south the city lies near the former island of Guacolda which was joined to the continent and developed as part of an area of heavy industry hosting a thermoelectic power plant, the mineral processing plant Planta de Pellets and a deep water port.

In the 17th century the port was raided twice by English pirates; first by Bartholomew Sharp in 1680 and then by Edward Davis in 1686. During the Chilean War of Independence the bay was visited twice by Royalist ships while under the control of the Patriots, first in 1813 and then in 1817 but Huasco was spared from combat.

Huasco saw significant economic development in the 19th century. Albeit the port and settlement of Huasco existed since centuries, it was officially established in 1850. The port was used between 1851 and 1873 to ship copper ore, copper regulus, alpaca wool and hides round Cape Horn to Swansea, Glamorgan and Wales. A new large pier was inaugurated in 1886 and in 1892 a railroad to the inland town of Vallenar was opened. Today, Huasco has two ports; the general port of Las Losas and the mining ports of Guacolda I and II. Together these ports stand for 7.5% of the annual tonnage of Chile's external trade as of 2024.

Huasco gets its name from the river of the same name. The etymology of Huasco is uncertain, it is often suggested the word is of Quechua origin but proposals for its meaning differ more for example "gold river", "cold river", "ravine" or "mudflow".

== Demographics ==
According to the 2002 census of the National Statistics Institute, Huasco had 7,945 inhabitants (3,999 men and 3,946 women). Of these, 6,445 (81.1%) lived in urban areas and 1,500 (18.9%) in rural areas. The population grew by 5.7% (429 persons) between the 1992 and 2002 censuses.

== Administration ==
As a commune, Huasco is a third-level administrative division of Chile administered by a municipal council, headed by an alcalde who is directly elected every four years. The 2008-2012 alcalde is Rodrigo Loyola Morenilla.

Within the electoral divisions of Chile, Huasco is represented in the Chamber of Deputies by Alberto Robles (PRSD) and Giovanni Calderón (UDI) as part of the 6th electoral district, (together with Caldera, Tierra Amarilla, Vallenar, Freirina and Alto del Carmen). The commune is represented in the Senate by Isabel Allende Bussi (PS) and Baldo Prokurica Prokurica (RN) as part of the 3rd senatorial constituency (Atacama Region).
