= Huasco Province =

Huasco Province Provincia de Huasco
- Province
- Seal Location in the Atacama Region Location in Chile
- Coordinates: 28°32′S 70°22′W
- Country: Chile
- Region: Atacama
- Capital: Vallenar
- Communes: List of 4: Vallenar; Huasco; Freirina; Alto del Carmen

Government
  - Type: Provincial
  - Presidential Provincial Delegate: Rodrigo Loyola Morenilla (Ind.)

Area
  - Province: 18,201.5 km^{2} (7,027.6 sq mi)
  - Rank: 3

Population (2012 census)
  - Province: 72,145
  - Rank: 2
  - Density: 3.9637/km^{2} (10.266/sq mi)
  - Urban: 53,664
  - Rural: 12,827

Sex
  - Men: 32,712
  - Women: 33,779
- Time zone: UTC-4 (CLT)
  - Summer (DST): UTC-3 (CLST)
- Area code: 56 + 51
- Website: dpphuasco.gob.cl

Huasco Province (Spanish pronunciation: [ˈwasko], Spanish: Provincia de Huasco) is one of three provinces of the northern Chilean region of Atacama (III). Vallenar is the capital city.

== Geography and demography ==
According to the 2012 census by the National Statistics Institute, the province spans an area of 18,201.5 km^{2} (7,028 sq mi) and had a population of 72,145, giving it a population density of 3.7/km^{2} (10/sq mi). The province had a 2002 population of 66,491 Of these, 53,664 (80.7%) lived in urban areas and 12,827 (19.3%) in rural areas. Between the 1992 and 2002 censuses, the population grew by 2.7% (1,761 persons).

== Administration ==
As a province, Huasco is a second-level administrative division of Chile, which is further divided into four communes (comunas). The province is administered by a presidentially appointed provincial delegate. Rodrigo Loyola Morenilla was appointed by president Gabriel Boric.

=== Communes ===
1. Vallenar
2. Freirina
3. Huasco
4. Alto del Carmen
