= Huasco River =

River in northern Chile

Coordinates: 28°26′02″S 71°12′11″W

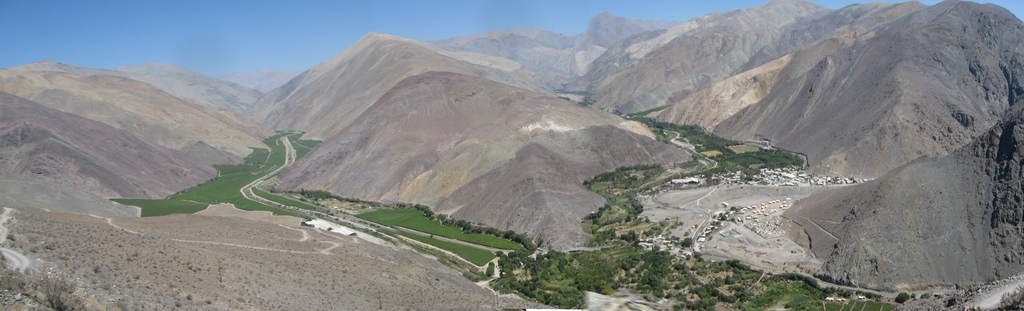
- Confluence of the Huasco River with the Del Tránsito River (left) and Del Carmen River (right)

Location
- Country: Chile

Physical characteristics
- Source
  - location: Del Carmen River and Del Tránsito River
- Mouth
  - location: Pacific Ocean
- Length: 88 km (55 mi)
- Basin size: 9,850 km^{2} (3,800 sq mi)

Huasco River is a river of Chile located in the Huasco Province, Atacama Region. Its headwaters in the upper catchments in high-altitude Andes glaciers are the Estrecho River, a tributary of El Tránsito River (catchment area 4,135 km2), and Potrerillos River, a tributary of El Carmen River (catchment area 2 890 km2). The Huasco River begins at the confluence of El Tránsito River and El Carmen River which is located in Junta del Carmen (790ma.s.l.).

Cities and towns along the Huasco include: Vallenar, Freirina and Huasco. Near Vallenar the river is crossed by Huasco Bridge which was planned in 1964 and finished in 1977. The river is an important source of water for agriculture and fed as of 2018 a network of 319 irrigation channels. The main crops planted along the valley are table grapes, olives and forage cultivars like alfalfa.

The river has been affected by drought several times in history, notably in 1819, 1821, 1924–1925, 1933, 1967–1969 and 1988–1990. This last drought contributed to launch the construction of the long-planned Embalse Santa Juana that impounds a small portion of the river's course. Large floods and mudflows in the river occurred in 1833, 1905–1906, 1997 and 2015.

The etymology of Huasco is uncertain, it is often suggested the word is of Quechua origin but proposals for its meaningen differ more for example "gold river", "cold river", "ravine" or "mudflow".

== Andean glaciers and the Huasco River Basin ==
The inhabitants of the Huasco valley, a semi-arid region, depend on water resources from the upper catchments in high-altitude Andes glaciers which contribution to the discharge of two Huasco River headwaters: the Estrecho River and the Potrerillos River which arise from two small neighboring catchments, they actually belong to two major subcatchments of the Huasco Basin.

A collaborative study between the Centro de Estudios Avanzados en Zonas Áridas (CEAZA) and the Laboratoire de Glaciologie et Géophysique de l'Environnement (LGGE) investigated the glacier contribution to the Huasco River basins by two glaciated headwater catchments which included the monitoring of five Andean glaciers (Toro 1, Toro 2, Esperanza, Guanaco, Estrecho and Ortigas) between 2003/2004 and 2007/2008 hydrological years. The Andean "glaciers accelerated retreat" represents a "striking example of climate change impacts."

Concerns have been raised that the Andean glaciers, particularly Toro 1, Toro 2 and Esperanza, were endangered by the Pascua Lama project.

In May 2013, Chile's Superintendence of the Environment Superintendencia del Medio Ambiente (SMA) notified Barrick Gold that the company had to cease construction activities at Pascua-Lama until they complete water management system in accordance with the project's environmental permit. Barrick Gold was also fined approximately $16 million for noncompliance regarding the project's water management system.

== See also ==
- List of rivers of Chile
