= Atacama Region =

Region of Chile

Atacama Region Región de Atacama
- Region of Chile
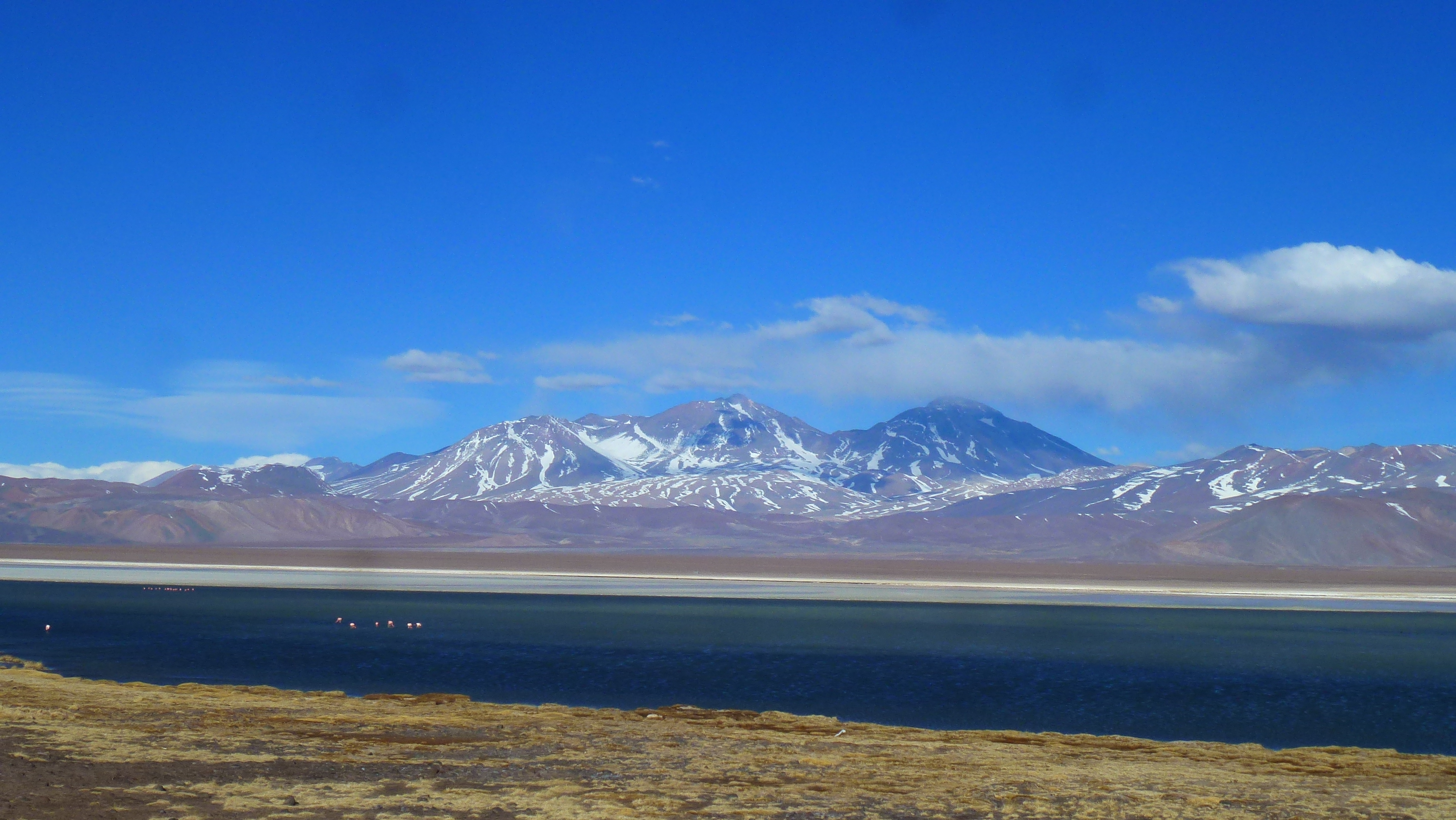
- Nevado Tres Cruces National Park

- Flag Seal

- Map of Atacama Region
- Coordinates: 27°22′00″S 70°19′56″W
- Country: Chile
- Capital: Copiapó
- Provinces: Chañaral, Copiapó, Huasco

Government
  - Intendant: Francisco Sánchez (RN)

Area
  - Total: 75,176.2 km^{2} (29,025.7 sq mi)
  - Rank: 4
- Highest elevation: 6,891.3 m (22,609 ft)
- Lowest elevation: 0 m (0 ft)

Population (2024 census)
  - Total: 299,180
  - Rank: 13
  - Density: 3.9797/km^{2} (10.307/sq mi)

GDP (PPP)
  - Total: $8.595 billion (2014)
  - Per capita: $27,882 (2014)
- ISO 3166 code: CL-AT
- HDI (2022): 0.864 very high
- Website: Official website (in Spanish)

The Atacama Region (Spanish: Región de Atacama, pronounced [ataˈkama]) is one of Chile's 16 first order administrative divisions. It comprises three provinces: Chañaral, Copiapó and Huasco. It is bordered to the north by Antofagasta, to the south by Coquimbo, to the east by the provinces of Catamarca, La Rioja and San Juan of Argentina, and to the west by the Pacific Ocean. The regional capital Copiapó is located 806 km (501 mi) north of the country's capital of Santiago. The region occupies the southern portion of the Atacama Desert, the rest of the desert is mainly distributed among the other regions of Norte Grande. As a generalization south of Copiapó River the region is mostly semi-arid and north of it is a true desert. The inland north also differs from the south by hosting active volcanoes, part of the Central Volcanic Zone of the Andean Volcanic Belt.

The region has a long tradition of mining that features a silver rush from 1832 to 1850 and a strong development of iron mining from 1952 to 1966. Besides silver and iron the region also hosts valuable reserves of gold, copper and lithium. Agriculture in the region is mainly restricted to the valleys of Copiapó and Huasco where irrigation is aided by the dams of Lautaro and Santa Juana respectively. Crops cultivated include table grapes, olives, alfalfa and pisco grapes.

== Demography ==
The Atacama Region is the third least populated region of the country, after Aisén and Magallanes. Of its total population, over 50% are located in the cities of Copiapó and Vallenar.

The largest cities are (2024 census data) Copiapó (168,831 inhabitants), Vallenar (54,222), Caldera (18,805), Chañaral (12,345), Tierra Amarilla (11,846), and Diego de Almagro (11,397), and Huasco (9,369)

== History ==
The original inhabitants of this area were the Diaguitas and Changos.

The region experienced a boom when the Chañarcillo silver mine was discovered by Juan Godoy in 1832.

== Natural features ==
Much of the region is desert, and encompasses considerable mineral resources. Numerous flora and fauna species are found in the Atacama Region. One subspecies of the lesser rhea, known by the scientific name Rhea pennata tarapacensis, is a notable large terrestrial bird in this region, which subspecies is considered endangered. The diminished numbers of this bird are due to prehistoric and modern hunting but more significantly due to agricultural land conversion in order to feed the expanding human population.

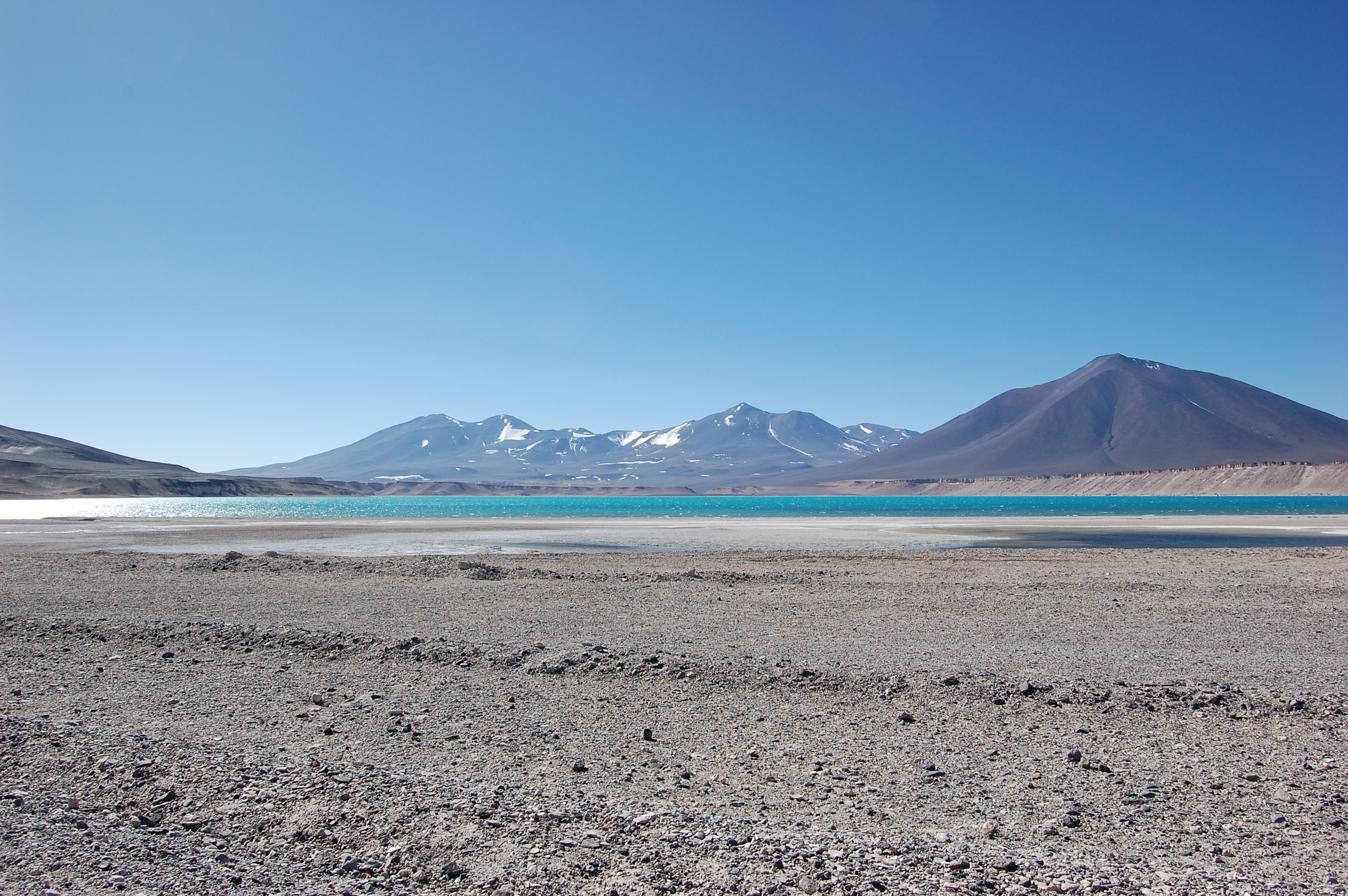
Laguna Verde

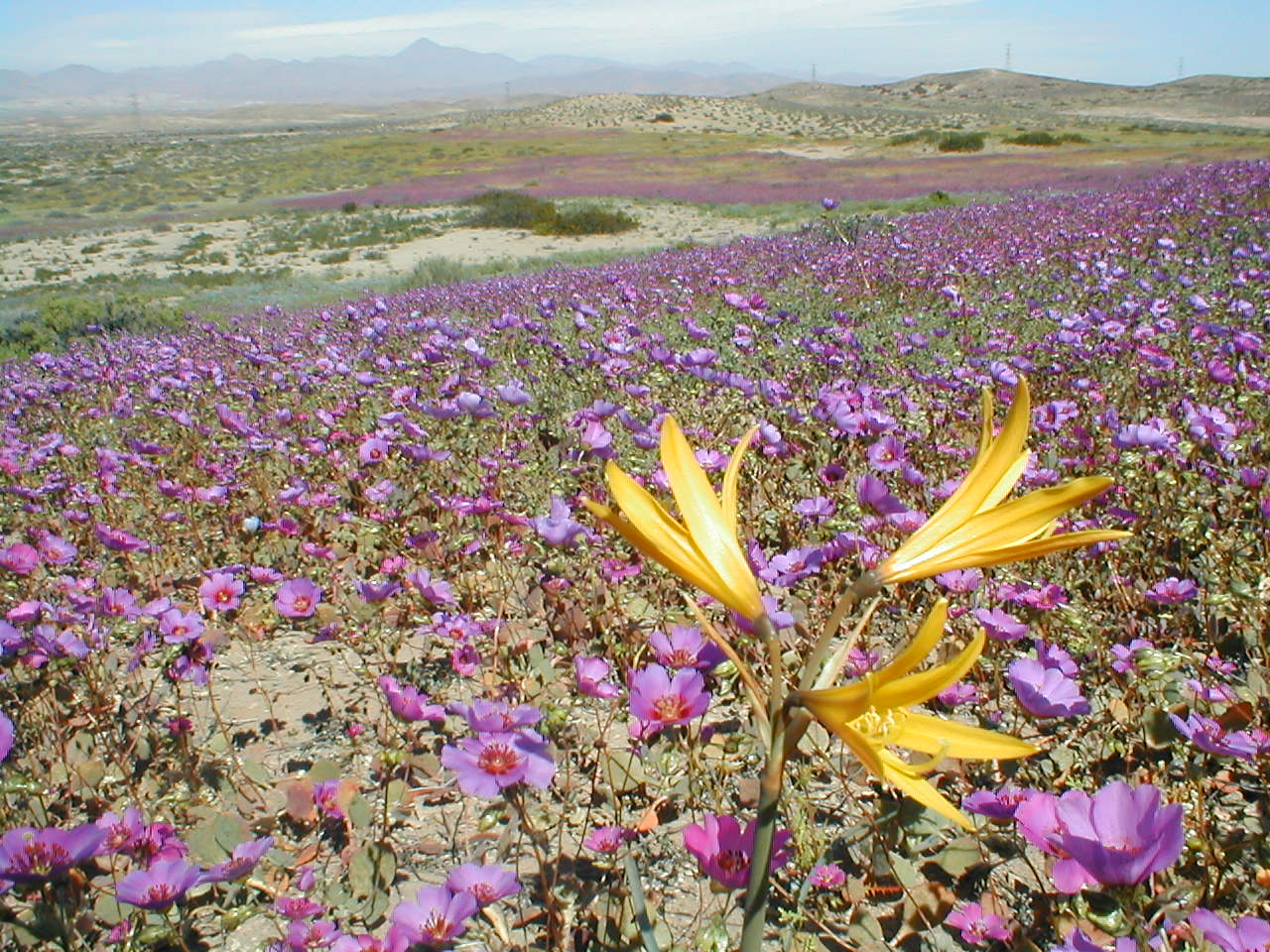
Desert in bloom

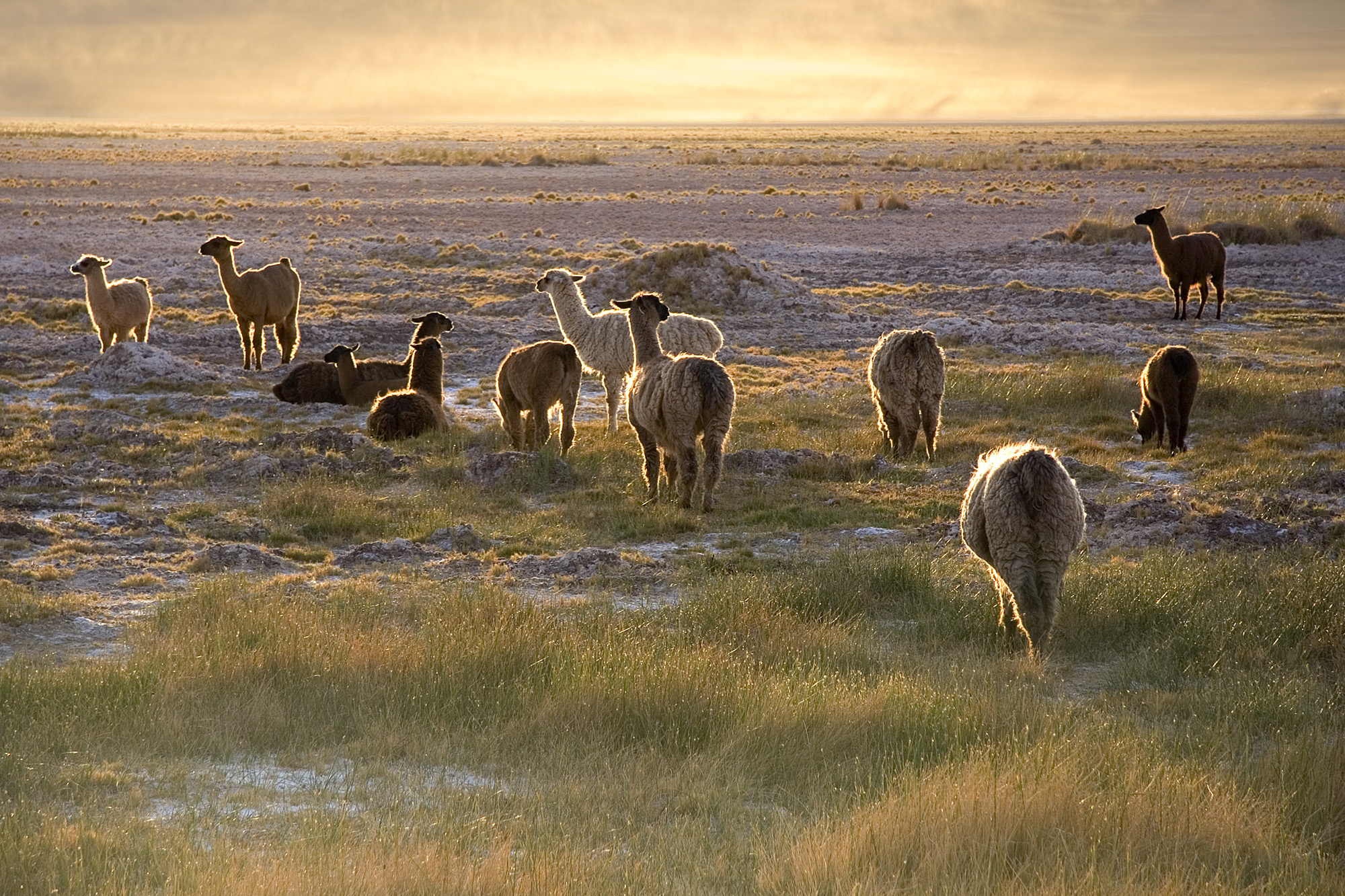
Llamas in the desert

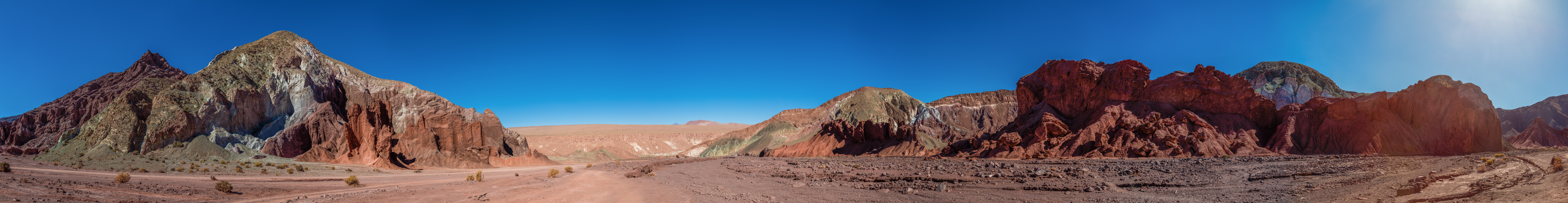
Rainbow Valley

The geology of the region has four metallogenetic belts where deposits of valuable metals are found. From west to east these belts are the Atacama Fault System (copper and iron), the Inca de Oro Belt (silver, gold), the West Fissure System (copper) and lastly the Maricunga Belt (gold) close to the Argentine border. The Chilean Iron Belt largely follows the Atacama Fault System.

== Economy ==
Mining accounts for 41% of the region's GDP and 90% of its exports. Moreover, various geological surveys have identified new deposits. In Atacama Region medium and small-scale mining has a larger share of mining properties relative to large-scale mining that is dominant in the more northern regions of Tarapacá and Antofagasta. The region's mining activity is centered on copper mining, but it host most of Chile's iron and gold mines. In Atacama Region there are numerous small-scale mines, which sell their output to ENAMI (the national mining company) for processing at its Paipote smelter. The region's main copper deposit is Candelaria, which produces around 200,000 tonnes per year and is controlled by Phelps Dodge, an international corporation. The next in size is El Salvador, owned by CODELCO, with an annual output of around 81,000 tonnes. Both mines export through the port of Chañaral.

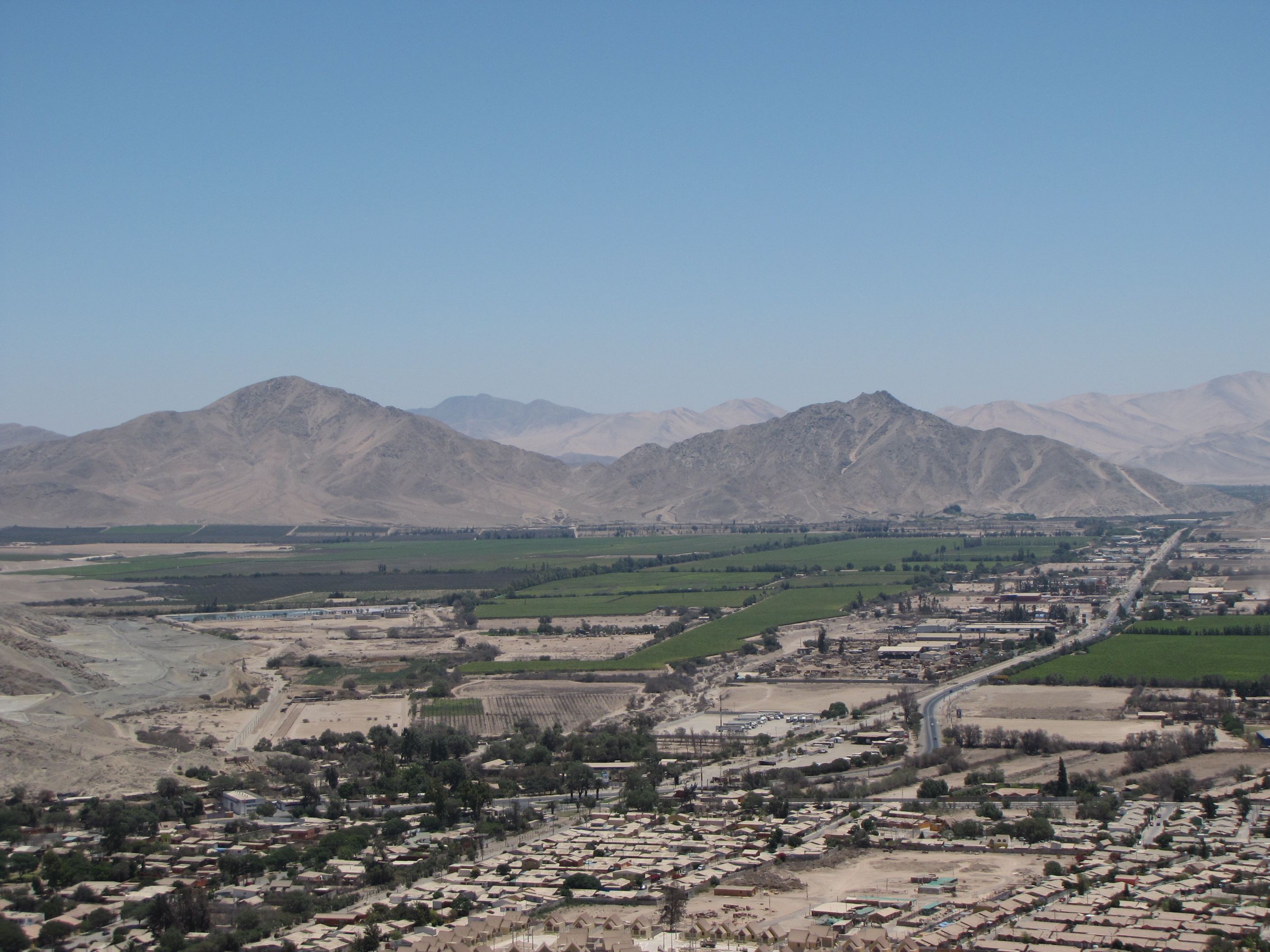
Irrigated fields in the outskirts Copiapó.

Over recent decades, fresh fruit also emerged as regional export item, when the Copiapó and Huasco valleys joined Chile’s fruit-growing boom. They enjoy a comparative advantage because, thanks to the sunny climate, fruit ripens earlier than in the rest of the country and reaches northern hemisphere markets first. Grapes are the main crop and, on a smaller scale, olives, tomatoes, peppers, onions, broad beans, citrus fruits, nectarines, apricots, oregano, and flowers. The region's organic wealth, its clear waters and sheltered bays, together with its entrepreneurial experience, favor the development of aquaculture. Species produced include the northern scallop, Japanese and Chilean oysters, abalone, turbot, algae, and different varieties of mussels. Other products with more value added include boned fish fillets, smoked and salted fish, roe, and fishburgers.

The weather conditions in the Atacama Desert, with extremely rare cloudy days, are ideal for solar power generation. Many PV and CSP plants are being built in this area.

== See also ==
- Flag of Atacama
