= Economic history of Chile =

The economy of Chile has shifted substantially over time from the heterogeneous economies of the diverse indigenous peoples to an early husbandry-oriented economy and finally to one of raw material export and a large service sector. Chile's recent economic history (since 1973) has been the focus of an extensive debate, as it pioneered neoliberal economic policies.

Chile emerged into independence as a rural economy on what was the periphery of the Spanish Empire. A period of relative free trade that began with independence in the 1810s brought a modernizing development of certain sectors of the Chilean economy. This was accompanied by formation of a local business class, a novelty in Chile. Chile experienced its first modern economic crisis with the Long depression in the 1870s.

Historically, the Chilean economy has relied on natural resources (nitrate, copper, coal, silver, and gold). The exploitation of lucrative nitrate deposits of the north conquered in the War of the Pacific (1879–1884) marked a whole epoch in the history of Chile and the economic legacy of nitrate has been widely debated. The onset of Chilean industrialization has often been dated to the end of the 19th century.

In the first half of the 20th century Chile suffered severe economic recessions including the Great Depression. This period saw the rapid urbanization of the country, and a state-led partial "industrialization" that began in 1939. Large-scale copper mining replaced nitrate extraction as the country's main source of wealth. Chilean agriculture remained one of the most undeveloped sectors of economy and was stagnant, despite land reforms in the 1960s and 1970s, from 1930 to 1980.

In the mid-1970s under the influence of the Chicago Boys, Pinochet's military dictatorship initiated profound changes oriented to a "neoliberal" economic model. The government implemented trade liberalization, as well as privatization of state-owned assets. The democratic governments that succeeded the dictatorship since 1990 have largely continued its economic policies, but increased social spending and reduced poverty. Chilean exports and GDP per capita rose steadily through the 1980s and 1990s until the Asian crisis of 1997 after which economic growth slowed somewhat. In the post-1973 period there has been a rise in outsourcing, self-employment, informal employment and an increase in women's share in the labor force.

== Pre-Hispanic economy ==
In the Far North the Pre-Hispanic economy of indigenous groups were divided among those that practised agriculture and were sedentary and the Changos that lived as coastal hunter-gatherers. The sedentary groups raised llamas and practised irrigation techniques. Bone necklaces, gold and copper objects interpreted as luxury goods suggest according to Villalobos et al. certain level of social stratification among the sedentary groups.

At the time of the arrival of the first Spaniards to Chile the largest indigenous population concentration was in the area spanning from Itata River to Chiloé Archipelago. In this area indigenous groups practised glade agriculture among the forests. The forests provided firewood, fibre and allowed the production of planks. Agriculture type varied; while some Mapuches and Huilliches practised a slash-and-burn type of agriculture some more labour-intensive agriculture is known to have been developed by Mapuches around Budi Lake (raised fields) and the Lumaco and Purén valleys (canalized fields). Pre-Hispanic agriculture extended as far south as the Guaitecas Archipelago (44° S), were indigenous Chonos cultivated Chiloé potatoes. Tools are known to have been relatively simple. In addition the Mapuche and Huilliche economy was complemented with chilihueque raising. The southern coast was particularly rich in molluscs, algaes, crustaceans and fish.

The fjords and channels of the Chilean Far South (excluding Chiloé Archipelago) were inhabited by nomadic canoe-using hunter-gatherers. These groups included the Chonos, the Alacaluf and the Yaghans.

== Colonial economy ==
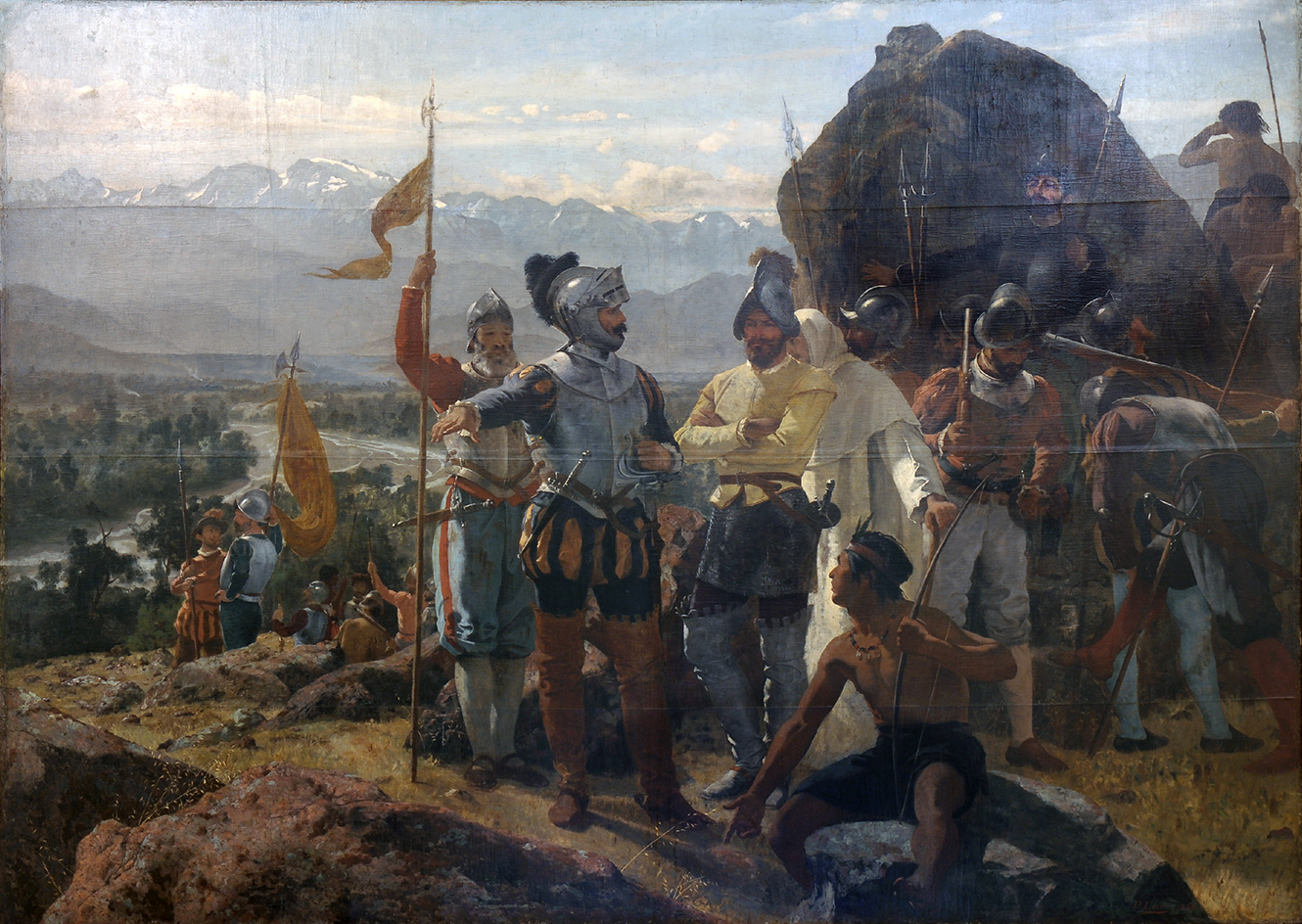
Founding of Santiago in 1541. The new cities were important for the economic order that emerged in Chile during its conquest.

=== Spanish conquest (1541–1600) ===
The conquest of Chile was not carried out directly by the Spanish Crown but by Spaniards that formed enterprises for those purposes and gathered financial resources and soldiers for the enterprise by their own. In 1541 an expedition (enterprise) led by Pedro de Valdivia founded Santiago initiating the conquest of Chile. The first years were harsh for the Spaniards mainly due to their poverty, indigenous rebellions and frequent conspirations. The second founding of La Serena in 1549 (initially founded in 1544 but destroyed by natives) was followed by the founding of numerous new cities in southern Chile halting only after Valdivia's death in 1553.

The Spanish colonization of the Americas was characterized by the establishments of cities in the middle of conquered territories. With the founding of each city a number of conquistadores became vecinos of that city being granted a solar and possibly also a chacra in the outskirts of the city, or a hacienda or estancia in more far away parts of the countryside. Apart from land natives were also distributed among Spaniards since they were considered vital for carrying out any economic activity.

Beyond subsistence the 16th century economy of Chile was oriented towards large-scale production. Spanish colonizers used large amounts of indigenous labour following the slave labour system used in the sugar cane plantations of the Mediterranean islands and Macaronesia. This system of labour successively killed the production base leading to the imposition of the encomienda system by the Spanish Crown in order to prevent excesses. In Chile Spanish settlers managed to continue to exploit indigenous labour under slave like conditions despite the implementation of the encomienda. Rich Spanish settlers had over time to face opposition to their mode of production by Jesuits, Spanish officials and indigenous Mapuches.

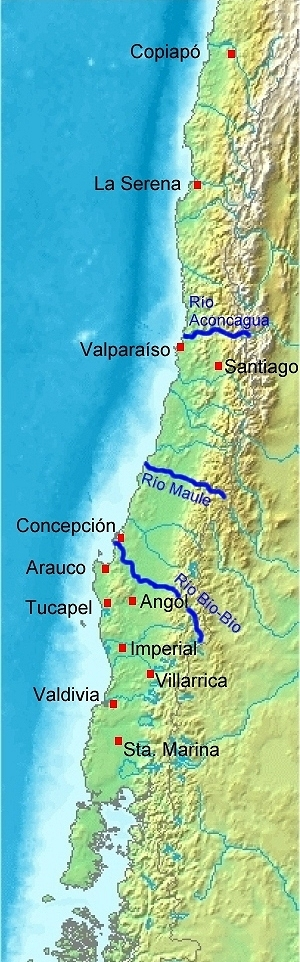
All mainland Spanish settlements (red dots) south of Biobío River were destroyed by 1604.

The initial Spanish settlers of Chiloé Archipelago (conquered in 1567) attempted to base their economy on gold extraction and a "hispanic-mediterranean" agricultural model. This activity ended in a general failure given the unsuitable conditions of the archipelago. Spaniards however reoriented their activities into logging Fitzroya.

=== Century of suet (1600–1687) ===
The collapse of the Spanish cities in the south following the battle of Curalaba (1598) meant for the Spaniards the loss of both the main gold districts and the largest indigenous labour sources. After those dramatic years the colony of Chile became concentrated in the central valley which became increasingly populated, explored and economically exploited. Following a tendency common in the whole Spanish America haciendas were formed as the economy moved away from mining and into agriculture and husbandry. Compared to the 16th and 18th centuries Chilean mining activity in the 17th century was very limited. Over the course of the 17th century the indigenous population of Chile declined, making the encomiendas less and less important. Chilean encomenderos who had encomiendas in Cuyo, across the Andes, introduced to Chile indigenous Huarpes who they hired to other Spanish without encomiendas.

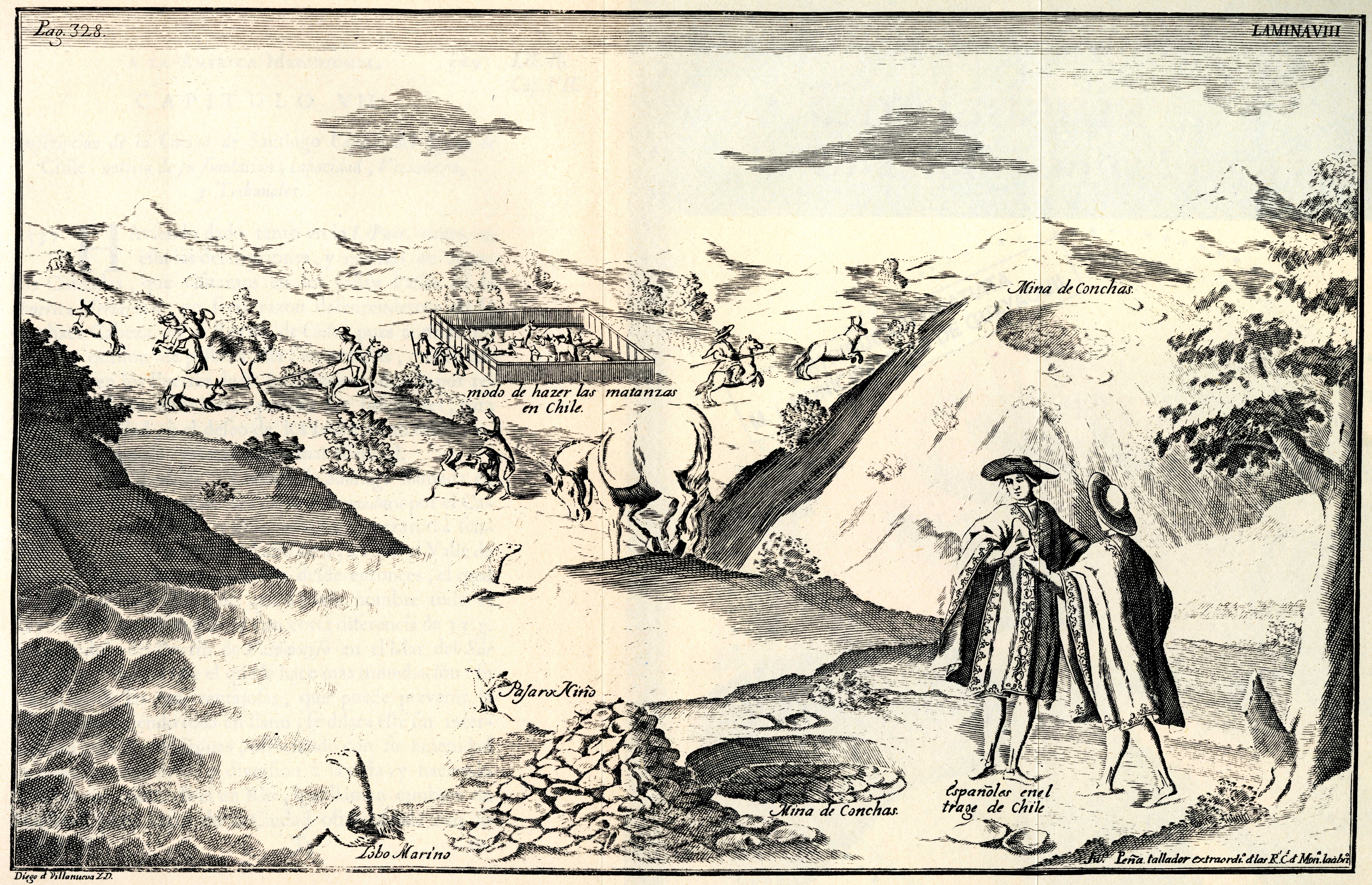
1744 engraving published in Relación histórica del viaje a la América meridional. The image shows cattle in the Chilean countryside including a square for cattle slaughter.

In the 17th century economy of the Viceroyalty of Peru, Chile's husbandry and agriculture based economy had a peripheral role, contrasting to ore-rich districts like Potosí and the wealthy city of Lima. Husbandry products made up the bulk of Chilean exports to the rest of the viceroyalty. These products included suet, charqui and leather. This trade made Chilean historian Benjamín Vicuña Mackenna label the 17th century the century of suet (Spanish: Siglo del sebo). Other products exported included dry fruits, mules, wines and minor amounts of copper. Trade with Peru was controlled by merchants from Lima that enjoyed protection by the Spanish authorities in Lima. In addition to the exports to coastal Peru Chile also exported products inland to Upper Peru through the port of Arica. Trade inside Chile was small since cities were tiny and self-sufficient.

Generally the extraction of wood had little importance in colonial Chile but Chiloé Archipelago and Valdivia were exceptions. These two areas exported planks to Peru. With the destruction of Valdivia in 1599 Chiloé gained increased importance as the only locale that could supply the Viceroyalty of Peru with Fitzroya wood. In 1641 the first large shipment of Fitzroya wood left Chiloé.

=== Century of wheat (1687–1810) ===
In the 1650–1800 period the Chilean lower classes grew considerably in size. To deal with the poor and landless population a policy of founding cities (Note: These cities were often in fact more of villages or towns due to their size.) and granting lands in their surroundings was implemented. From 1730 to 1820 a large number of farmers settled in the outskirts of old cities or formed new cities. Settling as a farmer in the outskirts of old cities (La Serena, Valparaíso, Santiago and Concepción) was overall more popular than joining a new city since it secured a larger consumer market for agricultural products. Chilean haciendas (latifundia) engaged little in the supply of Chilean cities but focused on international exports for revenues.

without Chile, Lima would not exist

— Viceroy José de Armendáriz in 1736

Chile begun exporting cereals to Peru in 1687 when Peru was struck by both an earthquake and a stem rust epidemic. Chilean soil and climatic conditions were better for cereal production than those of Peru and Chilean wheat was cheaper and of better quality than Peruvian wheat. According to historians Villalobos et al. the 1687 events were only the detonant factor for exports to start. The Chilean Central Valley, La Serena and Concepción were the districts that came to be involved in cereal export to Peru. It should be pointed out that compared with the 19th century the area cultivated with wheat was very small and production modest.

Initially Chilean latifundia could not meet the wheat demand due to a labour shortage, so had to incorporate temporal workers in addition to the permanent staff. Another response by the latifundia to labour shortages was to act as merchants buying wheat produced by independent farmers or from farmers that hired land. In the period 1700 to 1850 this second option was overall more lucrative.

The 1687 Peru earthquake also ended a Peruvian wine-boom as the earthquake destroyed wine cellars and mud containers used for wine storage. The gradual decline of Peruvian wine even caused Peru to import some wine from Chile as it happened in 1795 when Lima imported 5.000 troves (Spanish: botijas) from Concepción in southern Chile. This particular export showed the emergence of Chile relative to Peru as a wine-making region.

Haciendas of central Chile are believed to have become labour-saturated by 1780 generating an "excess" population that could not be incorporated into their economy. Some of this population settled in the outskirts of larger cities while other migrated to the mining districts of Norte Chico. Chile saw an unprecedented revival of its mining activity in the 18th century with annual gold production rising from 400 to 1000 kg over the course of the century and the silver annual production rising from 1000 to 5000 kg in the same interval.

In the 18th century the shipbuilding industry in Valdivia, one of the city's main economic activities, reached its peak building numerous ships including frigates. Other shipyards of Chile included those of Concepción and Chiloé Archipelago. The Chiloé shipyards constructed the bulk of the ships in Chile until the mid-18th century. In 1794 a new shipyards was established the mouth of Maule River (present day Constitución). Despite some navigators expressing that Valdivia had better conditions than Guayaquil in Ecuador, this last port was the chief shipyard of the Spanish Empire in the Pacific.

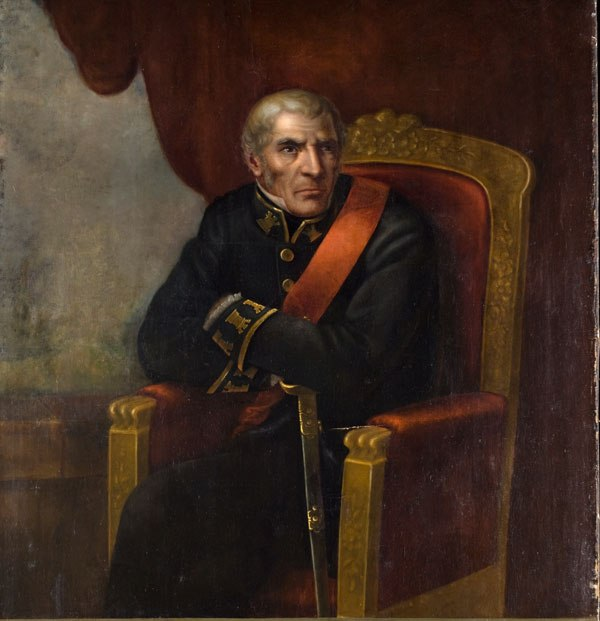
Smuggling became increasingly common in the 18th century Chile. Governor Francisco Antonio García Carrasco in picture was involved in a smuggling scandal.

Direct trade with Spain over the Straits of Magellan and Buenos Aires begun first in the 18th century constituting primarily an export route for gold, silver and copper from Chilean mining. By the same time Spain's trade monopoly with its colonies was successively weakened by smugglers from England, France and United States.

=== Independence Era (1810–1830) ===
The independence wars in Chile (1810–1818) and Peru (1809–1824) had a negative impact on the Chilean economy. Trade was disrupted and armies in Chile pillaged the countryside. The war made commerce a high risk activity and royalist Peru, then the only market for Chilean agricultural products, was closed to commerce with independent Chile. The Guerra a muerte phase was particularly destructive for the Biobío area and ended only to see a period of outlaw banditry (e.g. Pincheira brothers) occur until the late 1820s. Chilean mining activity came out of the independence wars with relatively little damage.

Trade with Peru did not fully recover after the independence struggles, instead commerce with United States, France and United Kingdom took off in the 1820s.

During the Chilean Independence War the scarcity of weapons in the Chilean market forced the patriots to do large weapon purchases abroad or to the ships that anchored at Chilean ports. In addition to the finance of the Chilean army the nascent Chilean state had also to wholly finance the Chilean-Argentine Army of the Andes after San Martín begun to disobey the orders from Argentina and the Freedom Expedition of Perú, originally thought to be financed in part by Argentina.

An expensive loan of £1,000,000 taken in 1822 in London in order to finance the independence struggle became a heavy burden for the Chilean state and took decades to pay off. Finance minister Diego José Benavente attempted to reform the tax system but met severe opposition to many measures. To pay off the loan the Chilean state granted the company Sociedad Portales, Cea y Cía a sales monopoly of tobacco in Chile, but this activity ended in failure.

== Liberalism ==
=== Early republican boom (1830–1873) ===
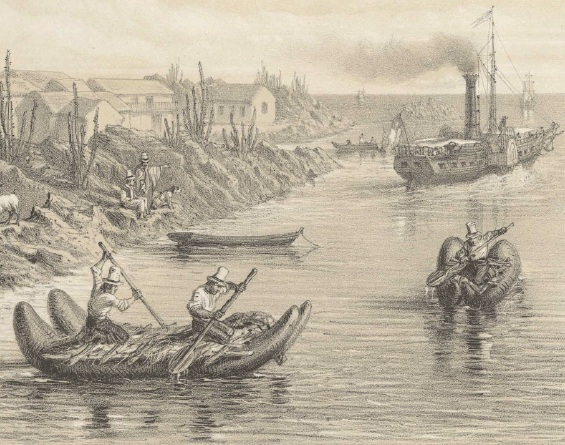
A modern Chilean steamboat and primitive rafts in Huasco in the 1850s illustrates the uneven modernization of the Chilean economy.

In the early republican period Chilean international trade grew considerably. Merchants from countries like England, Italy, Germany and the United States settled in Chile. Chile was officially open to trade to all nations since 1811 but applied protectionist policies to favour domestic production in a manner that has been called neomercantilism. Chile's relative openness to international trade contrasted with contemporary truly protectionistic policies of Peru and Argentina. The 1830–1870 period was one of the greatest growth for the Chilean economy and was largely indebted to two export booms: the copper and silver mining in Norte Chico and the Chilean wheat cycle. The overall development resulted in Chile becoming one of the high-income countries in South America.

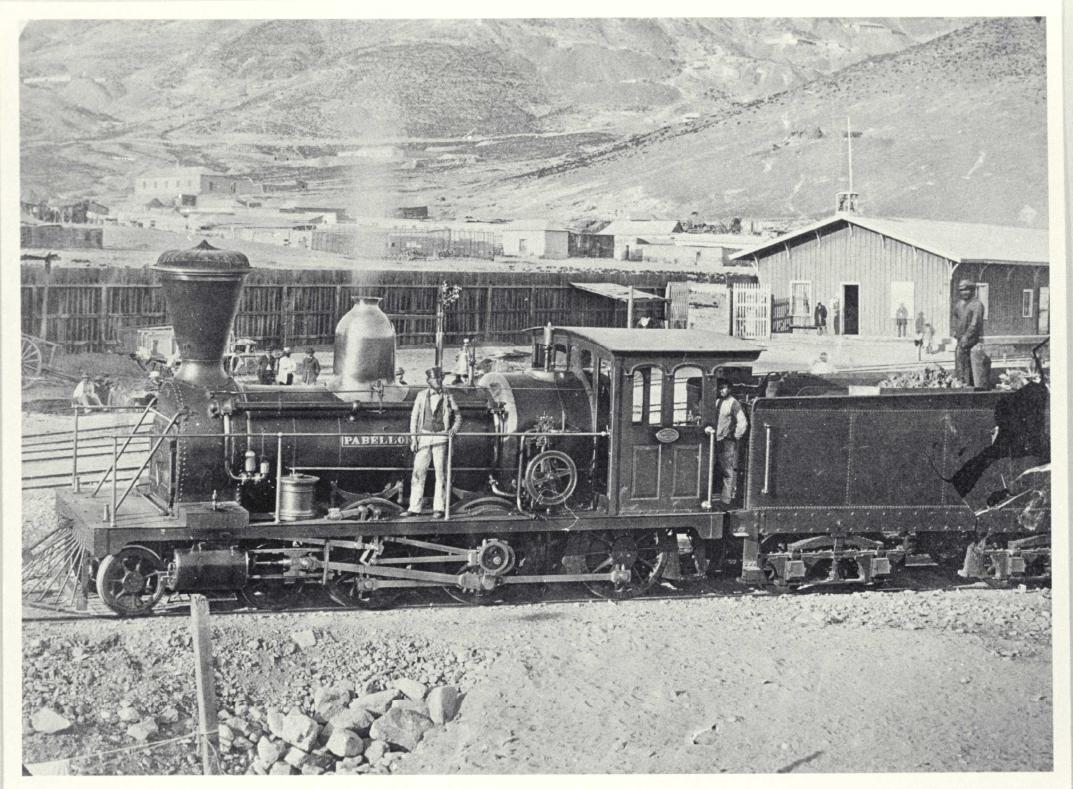
Chañarcillo train station, Atacama, Chile, 1862.

Following the discovery of silver at Agua Amarga (1811) and Arqueros (1825) the Norte Chico mountains north of La Serena were exhaustively prospected. In 1832 prospector Juan Godoy found a silver outcrop (reventón) 50 km south of Copiapó in Chañarcillo. The finding attracted thousands of people to the place and generated significant wealth. After the discovery of Chañarcillo, many other ores were discovered near Copiapó well into the 1840s. Copiapó experienced a large demographic and urbanistic growth during the rush. The town became a centre for trade and services of a large mining district. The mining zone slowly grew northwards into the diffuse border with Bolivia. At the end of the silver rush, rich miners had diversified their assets into banking, agriculture, trade and commerce all over Chile.

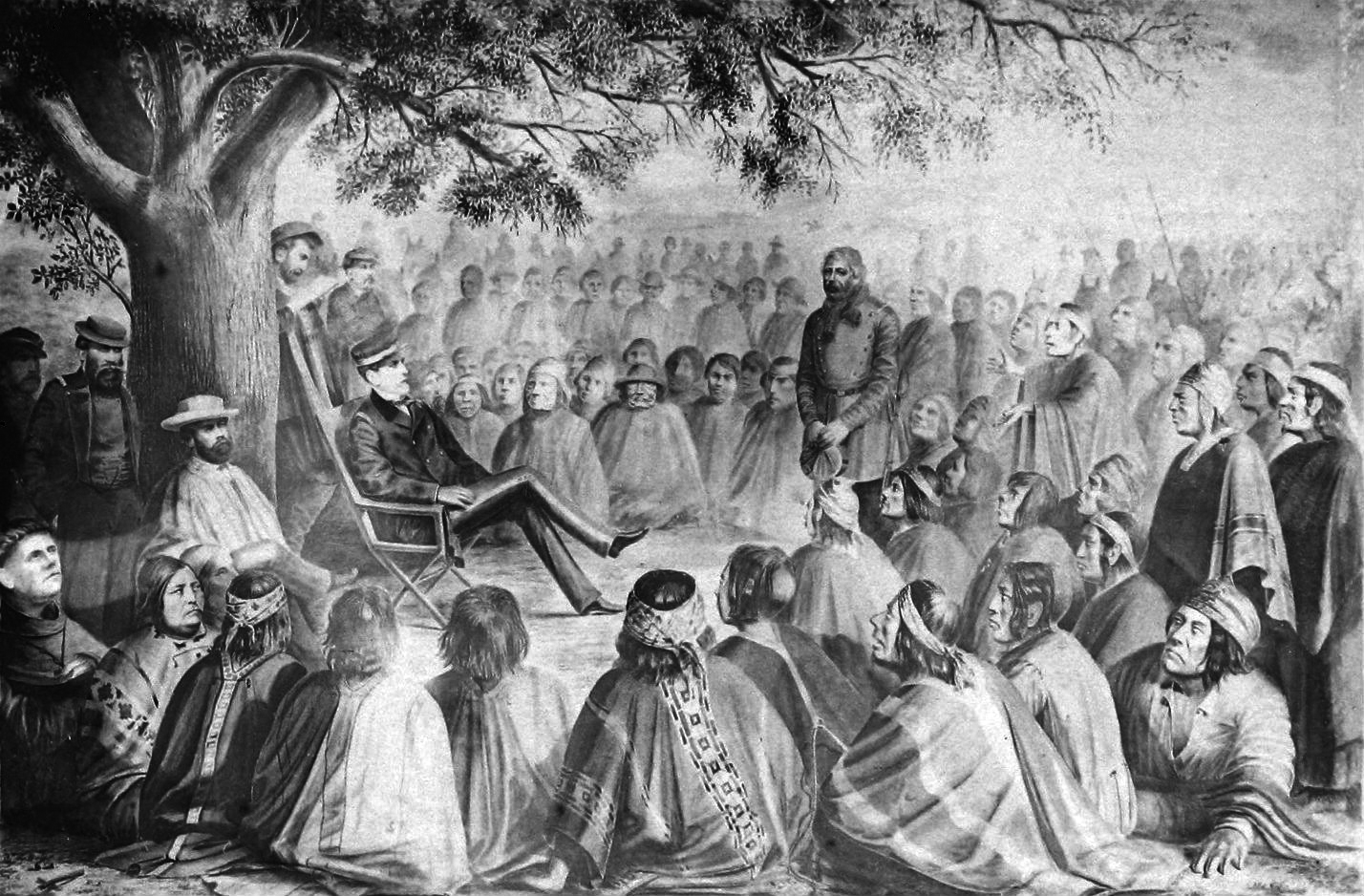
Cornelio Saavedra Rodríguez in a meeting with the main Mapuche loncos of Araucania in 1869. With the Occupation of the Araucanía, that culminated in the 1880s, new lands were made available for non-indigenous agriculture.

In the 19th century, access to the Californian and Australian markets made wheat export a very lucrative activity. In the mid 19th century, these countries experienced large gold rushes which created a large demand for wheat. Chile was at the time the "only wheat producer of some importance in the Pacific". At the same time as the wheat cycle new irrigation canals were built and apiculture and some machines introduced into Chilean agriculture. Apart from that, new markets were explored for Chilean agricultural products. The wheat boom did not last for long; by 1855 California managed to supply itself with wheat and from 1858 onwards it went over to export wheat to Chile. The Australian gold rush of 1851 had the effect of decreasing the labour used in agriculture forcing the colony to import wheat from Chile sustaining Chilean wheat exports whilst the Californian market vanished. After the gold rushes of California and Australia were over these regions begun exporting wheat competing with Chilean wheat forcing from the mid-1860s onwards wheat exports to be shifted to England. Between 1850 and 1875 the area cultivated with wheat and barley for export in Chile rose from 120 to 450 ha. The "cycle" came to an end in the late 1870s due to the increased technification of agriculture in the United States and Argentina plus the competition of Russia and Canada. The end of the wheat cycle added to the already difficult situation that Chilean economy was passing through in the 1870s.

In the mid-19th century the value relationship established by law between gold and silver coin undervalued silver coins causing the flight of silver from Chile due to better prices in the international market and a scarcity of silver coins in Chile. With the abolition of the silver standard in most countries that begun in Germany in 1871 the unadjusted Chilean rate that had previously undervalued silver came to undervalue gold instead.

Following independence in 1820 Valdivia entered a period of economic decline. This was because Valdivia was since colonial times isolated from Central Chile by hostile Mapuche territory and depended heavily upon seaborne trade with the port of Callao in Peru. With independence this intra-colonial traded ended but was not substituted by new routes. German immigrants that arrived from 1850 to 1875 transformed the economy of Valdivia and the whole Southern Chile. Among the achievements of the Germans immigrants was the deepening of division of labour, the introduction of wage labour in agriculture and the establishment of Chile's first beer brewery in Valdivia in 1851 by Carl Anwandter.

Until the mid-19th century more than 80% of Chilean population remained rural working in agriculture or mining and was to a large degree self-sufficient to produce articles of consume.

=== Saltpetre Republic (1873–1914) ===
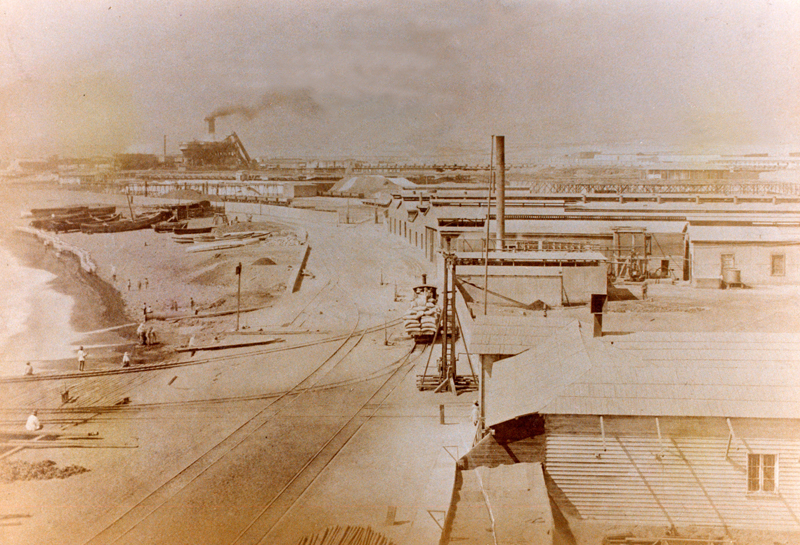
Antofagasta in 1879 in a photograph of Eduardo Clifford Spencer and Carlos Díaz Escudero. It is calculated that more than £ 1,000,000 had been invested in the region.

Starting in 1873, Chile's economy deteriorated. Chilean wheat exports were outcompeted by production in Canada, Russia, and Argentina. Chilean copper was largely replaced in international markets by copper from the United States and Río Tinto in Spain. Chile's silver mining income also dropped. In the mid-1870s, Peru nationalized its nitrate industry, affecting both British and Chilean interests. Contemporaries considered the crisis the worst ever of independent Chile. Chilean newspaper El Ferrocarril predicted 1879 to be "a year of mass business liquidation". In 1878, then-President Aníbal Pinto expressed his concern through the following statement:

If a new mining discovery or some novelty of that sort does not come to improve the actual situation, the crisis that has long been felt will worsen

— Aníbal Pinto, president of Chile, 1878.

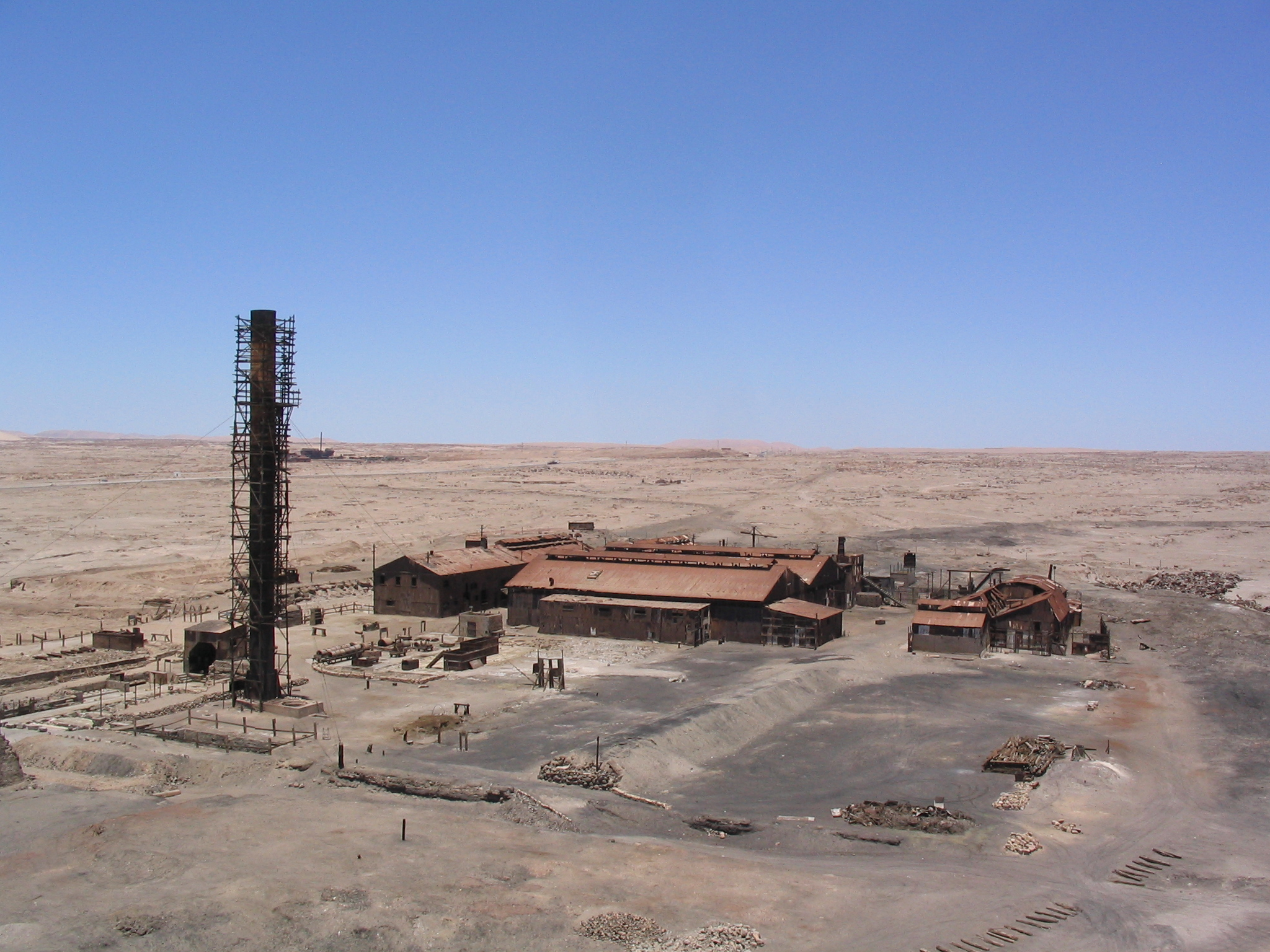
View of Humberstone, a saltpetre work from the Saltpetre Republic epoch.

It was during this context of economic crisis that Chile became involved the costly War of the Pacific (1879–1883) seizing control of mineral-rich provinces of Peru and Bolivia. The notion that Chile entered the war to obtain economical gains has been a topic of debate among historians. The crisis in has also been considered by Jorge Pinto Rodríguez a force behind the new pulse of conquest of indigenous lands that took place in Araucanía in the 1870s.

When Chile found herself in command of the then still Peruvian province of Tarapacá during the War of the Pacific and being subjected to pressure from Peru's creditors, who threatened Chile's credit in Europe if their claims were not met, the Chilean government essentially had two options: to nationalize the industry for Chile (that is to pay the Peruvian debt certificates), or to recognize the holders of the Peruvian debt certificates (which John Thomas North hurried to purchase at knock-down prices) as the owner of the assets. On June 11, 1881, Chile issued a decree in favor of the second option and to enact an export tax upon the export of saltpeter. The Chilean war debts, the impossibility to assume the financial obligations of nitrate certificates and the will to deflate European opposition to the annexation were the reasons to the decree that was criticized in Chile after the war.

As the victor and possessor of a new coastal territory following the War of the Pacific, Chile benefited by gaining a lucrative territory with significant mineral income. The national treasury grew by 900 percent between 1879 and 1902, due to taxes coming from the newly acquired lands. British involvement and control of the nitrate industry rose significantly, but from 1901 to 1921 Chilean ownership increased from 15% to 51%. The growth of Chilean economy sustained in its saltpetre monopoly meant, compared to the previous growth cycle (1832–1873), that the economy became less diversified and overly dependent on a single natural resource. In addition the Chilean nitrate, used worldwide as fertilizer, was sensitive to economic downturns as farmers made cuts on fertilizer use one of their earliest economic measures in the face of economic decline. It has been questioned on whether the nitrate wealth conquered in the War of the Pacific was a resource curse or not. During the Nitrate Epoch the government increased public spending but was however accused of squandering money.

The 1870s saw of industries like sugar refineries, confectioneries and shoe and textile factories emerge. Since the 1880s some scholars argue that Chile was en route to becoming an industrialized nation before 1914, economist Ducoing claims no industrialization took place, but rather a modernization process.

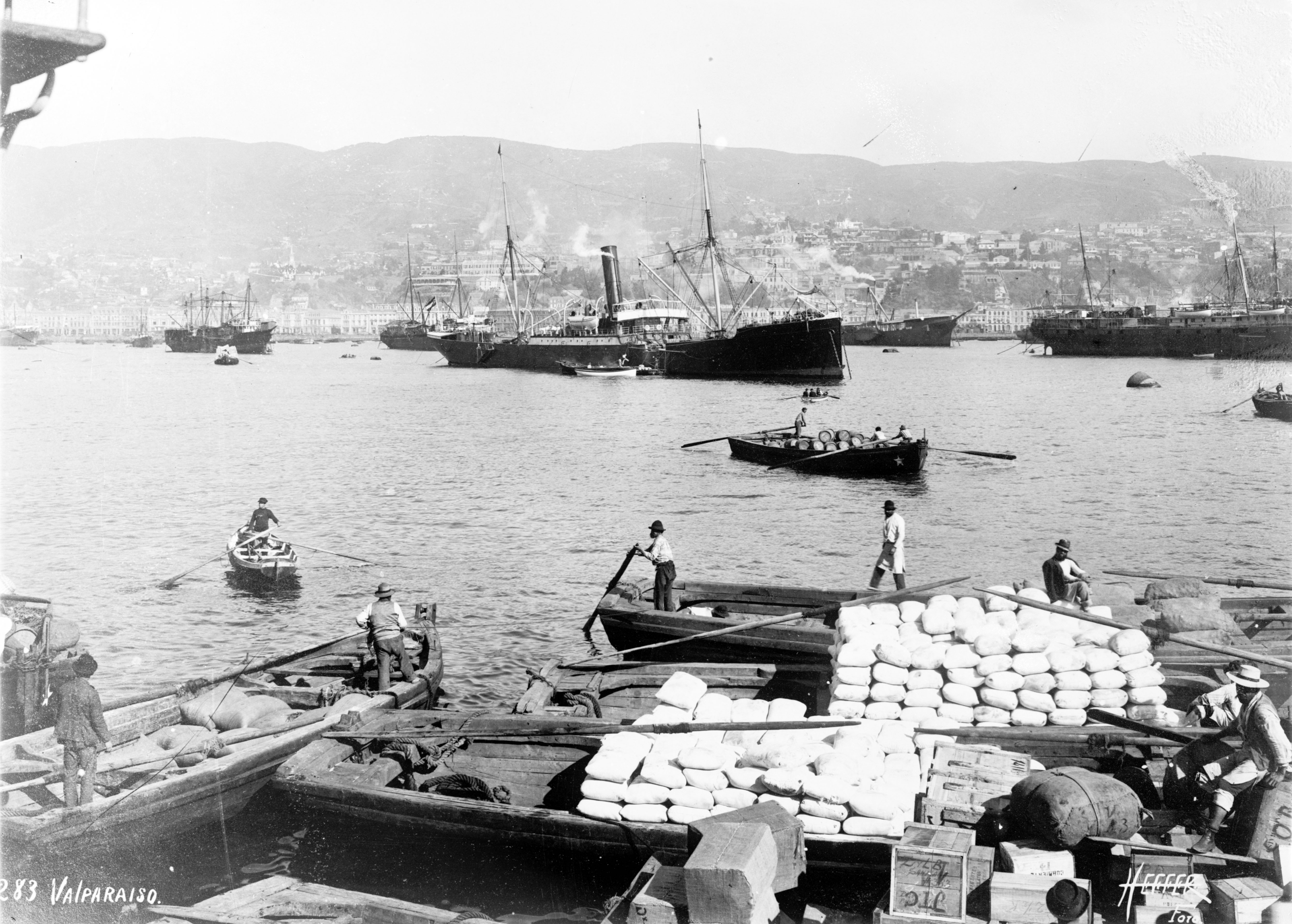
View of the harbour of Valparaíso (1908–1919). Until the opening of the Panama Canal Valparaíso was one of the principal ports of the Pacific.

Starting in 1878, the Chilean state increased the issuing of new banknotes (fiat currency) causing the Chilean peso to devaluate. When the War of the Pacific began in 1879 the government issued more fiat currency in order to afford the costly war, and continued to do so in 1880 and 1881. In 1881 the country prepared for a return to the gold standard and to gradually eliminate fiat currency. The gold standard was implemented from 1895 to 1898. However, during the Chilean Civil War in 1891 the government of José Manuel Balmaceda issued more fiat money to finance this new war. By 1891 a dispute begun between those who supported a return to gold convertibility of money ("oreros") and those who opposed convertibility ("papeleros"). In 1892 the "oreros" succeeded in having the convertibility of currency approved by law and in December 1895 non-convertible legal tender was pulled out of circulation. In 1898 the convertible regime collapsed once again in the face of severe economic instability (crop failure, war scare) and was abolished. Issuing of fiat money then continued until 1907 but from there on currency was issued with convertibility to gold or saltpetre mining related legal titles.

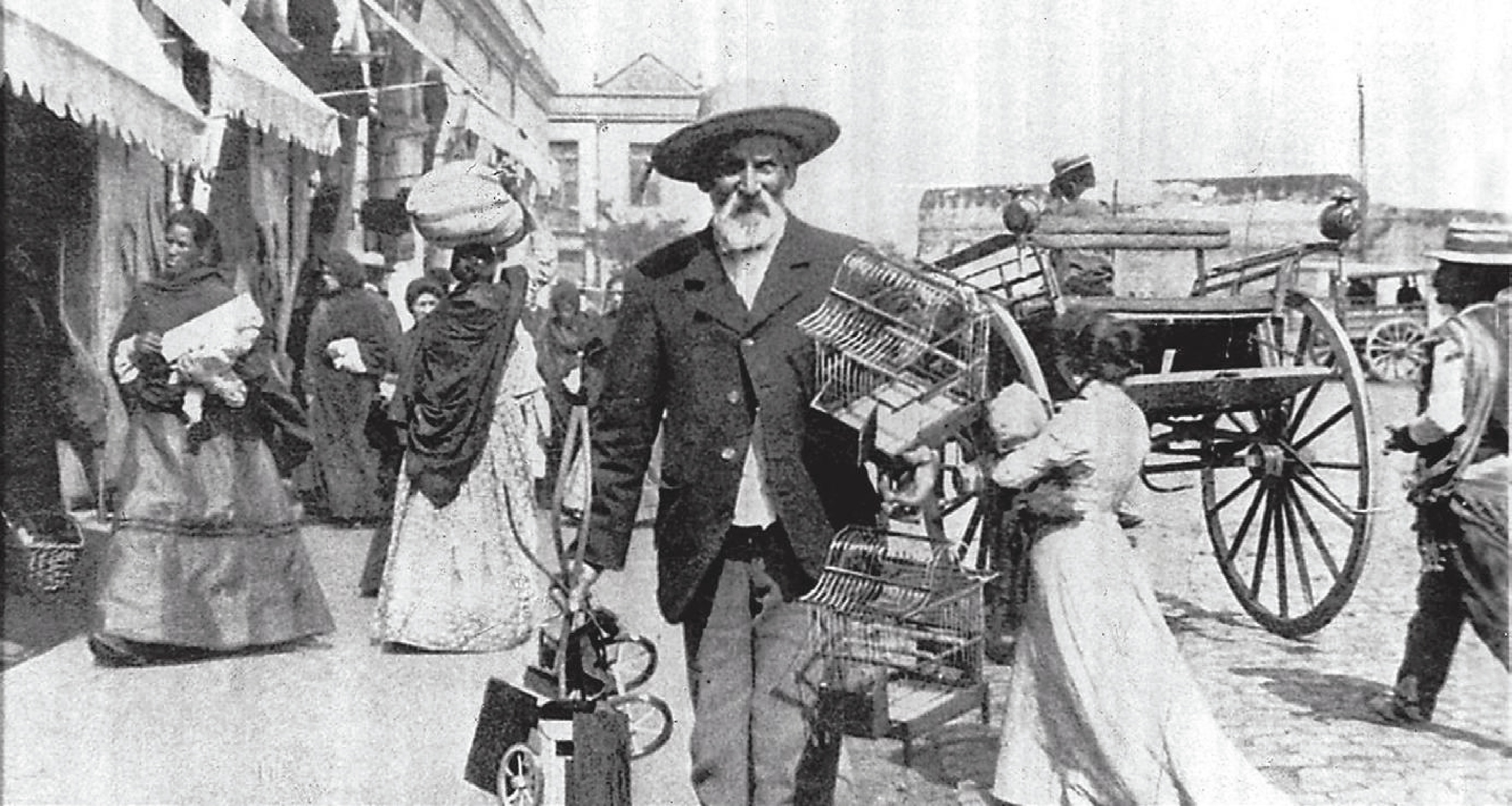
Chilean hawker in the early 20th century.

The establishment of the Buenos Aires-Mendoza railroad in 1885 ended the lengthy and costly trade with carts that connected these two regions of Argentina and facilitated cattle exports from the pampas to Chile, albeit in the last portion of the route the cattle had to walk over the high mountain passes of the Andes. These imports resulted in a lowering of meat prices in Chile. Sociedad Nacional de la Agricultura (National Agriculture Society), a landowners organization, pushed for a tariff on Argentine cattle and in 1897 the tariff was passed in a bill at the Chilean congress. The unpopular tariff resulted a massive protest in that degenerated into a destructive riot in Santiago in October 1905. Chilean wine exports to Argentina were hampered by the lack of effective land transport and a series of war scares. This situation changed after the Pactos de Mayo were signed in 1902 and the inauguration of the Transandine Railway in 1909, making war unlikely and trade across the Andes easier. Both governments agreed to sign a free trade agreement. The Argentine winegrowers association, Centro Vitivinícola Nacional, seeing Chilean wines as a threat to domestic industry, protested vigorously against the agreement. Their complaints, in conjunction with that of Chilean cattle farmers represented by Sociedad Nacional de la Agricultura ended up tearing down the plans for a free trade agreement between Argentina and Chile.

The rapid economic expansion of the late 19th century occurred not only in the northern regions but also in the extreme south where in Tierra del Fuego a gold rush was triggered in 1884 fueled economic growth in Punta Arenas and attracted a considerable amount of European immigrants. Tierra del Fuego and much of Magallanes Region also experienced a boom in the sheepherding industry since the 1880s accompanied by colonization of the sparsely populated Patagonian grasslands. In the South-Central Araucanía the Chilean invasion of native Mapuche territory caused the economy of Araucanía to change from being based on sheep and cattle herding to one based on agriculture and wood extraction. The Mapuches' loss of land following the occupation caused severe erosion since Mapuches continued to practice large-scale livestock herding in limited areas.

=== Crisis and restructuring (1914–1938) ===
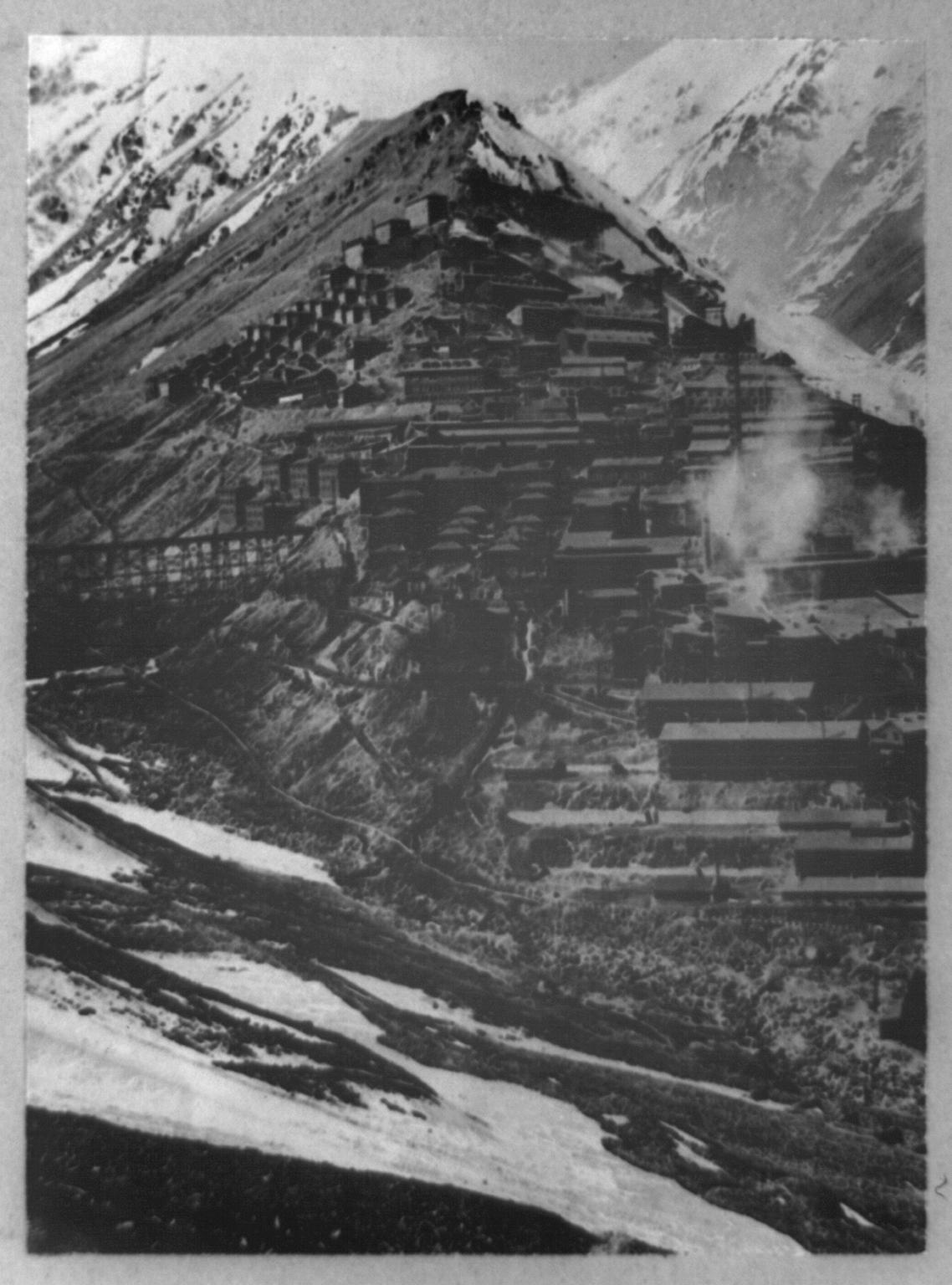
View of Sewell, a town created to serve El Teniente during the early days of the large-scale copper mining ("Gran Minería del Cobre").

The opening of Panama Canal in 1914 caused a severe drop in traffic along Chilean ports due to shifts in the maritime trade routes. In addition to this international trade collapsed and state income was reduced to half of its previous value after the start of the World War I in 1914. The Haber process, first applied on an industrial scale in 1913 and later used as part of Germany's war effort due to its lack of access to Chilean saltpetre, ended Chile's monopoly on nitrate and led to an economic decline in Chile. While saltpetre mining gradually waned in importance copper mining rose, exporting raw materials to a level unprecedented in the history of Chile. By 1929 copper exports had reached the same values as saltpetre exports, and in 1937 the value of copper exports largely surpassed that of saltpetre. In the 1920–1937 period both industries had combined a 70–83% share of the value of Chilean exports.

In the 20th century two new economic actors rose to prominence in Chile; the state and capital from the United States. Beginning in 1905 United States-based companies came to develop and control copper mining in Chile. The main companies were; Anaconda Copper in control of Chuquicamata, Kennecott Copper Corporation in control of El Teniente and Andes Copper in control of Potrerillos. Between the 1910s and 1930 United States investments in Chile had a tenfold increase, the bulk of which was directed to mining activities.

The increased influence of the United States in the Chilean economy was not limited to copper mining. By the end of the First World War, America had become the largest export market for Chilean goods and by the 1930s overtook the UK as Chile's greatest importer.

Edwin W. Kemmerer, referred to in an expression of the time as the money doctor, was invited to Chile in 1925 to deal with monetary policy and inflation problems which were considered one of the principal economic problems of Chile at the time. The visit by Kemmerer was used to back up monetary policies already outlined by Chileans. These reforms included the creation of a central bank, the establishment of a government budget law and general bank law. All these reforms were established by rule by decree by Arturo Alessandri who had been reestablished in power following a coup d'etat against him in 1924, in which the coup-makers protested among other things against inflation. Gold convertibility was established in 1925. As result of these reforms Chile managed to tame inflation to such degree that, over the 1890–1980 period, the 1920s were the decade with least inflation. Another consequence of the reforms was an increased easyness by Chile to obtain loans not only in the United States but also in the United Kingdom, Switzerland and Germany. In the years after the visit of Kemmerer there was a sharp increase in foreign investments.

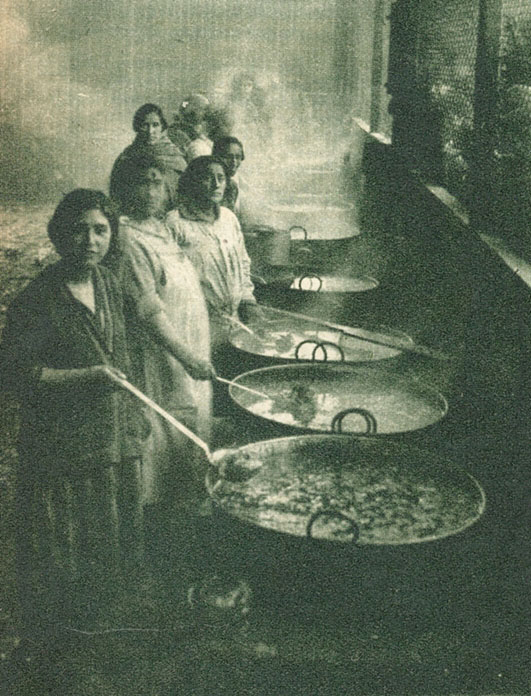
Soup kitchen to feed the unemployed in 1932.

The Great Depression that begun 1929 was felt strongly in Chile from 1930 to 1932. Saltpetre and copper exports collapsed. The World Economic Survey of the League of Nations declared Chile the worst affected nation by the depression. The crisis caused the authoritarian regime of Carlos Ibáñez del Campo to fall in July 1931 followed by a succession of short-lived governments until the election of Arturo Alessandri in December 1932. The economic crisis rose the levels of unemployment and caused a migration of unemployed saltpetre miners from the north to Santiago. Miners constituted around 6% of the active population but made up more than half of the unemployed during the crisis. Numerous soup kitchens sprang up in Santiago while homeless people begun to dwell in caves in the hills around the city. The state responded to the crisis by gradually raising tariffs, increasing internal demand and increasing control over the "flux and use" of foreign currency. Quotas and licences were established for imports and the gold convertibility was once again abolished in 1931.

These policies contributed to an industrial recovery and for the industry to already by 1934 surpass the levels of activity of 1929. In the 1930s the massive industrial growth was spearheaded by the textile industry, but non-metallic mining, chemical industries and machine and transport factories did also expand. Overall industry recovered and expanded faster than the traditional exports in the post depression period.

The Great Depression brought initially a period of deflation of Chilean currency followed by inflation in 1931 and 1932. The inflation was brought under control momentarily after 1932 but resurfaced again in 1936.

The 1900–1930 period was the one of largest growth of agriculture in the 20th century until the 1980s. Despite this, conditions in for rural workers remained harsh with Tancredo Pinochet denouncing the poor conditions of workers in the hacienda of president Juan Luis Sanfuentes during his presidency (1915–1920). Within a dual sector economic model the Chilean hacienda has been characterized as a prime example of a primitive and rural component. McBride, a British who visited Chile in the 1930s, is reported to have been "astounded" to see haciendas with "agricultural methods that reminds of ancient Egypt, Greece or Palestine."

The Faculty of Economical Science of the University of Chile was established in 1937 coinciding with the spread of Keynesian economics.

== Internal growth era ==
=== Partial industrialization (1938–1958) ===
Industrialization became a state policy from 1938 onwards. This policy line became possible after the victory of the Popular Front, a coalition including communists and socialists, in the 1938 elections. The perceived success of the Soviet economy, the fast growth of other centralized European economies and the influence of Keynesian economics helped to establish "development inwards" ideas in Chile paving the way for active state involvement in the nation's economy. These tendencies were reinforced in 1948 with the establishment of ECLAC (CEPAL in Spanish) in Santiago and the arrival of Raúl Prebisch in 1950 as director of it. Chile's "development inwards" policies were part of a regional phenomenon with Argentina, Brazil and Uruguay applying similar policies.

In the aftermath of the disastrous 1939 Chillán earthquake, the government created CORFO (Spanish acronym for Production Development Corporation) to help in the reconstruction of the country and to industrialize the country, mechanize the agriculture and help mining to develop. To finance CORFO loans were taken by the government, the bulk of the taxes were raised and copper mining in particular got an additional tax.

One of the early tasks of CORFO was to "solve the old problem of the ironworks". In doing so it injected capital and granted loans to the Compañía Electro-Siderúrgica e Industrial de Valdivia, the inheritor to the failed Altos Hornos y Acerías de Corral. In 1947 CORFO begun the construction of a large steel mill in Huachipato near Concepción which in 1950 begun operating as Compañía de Acero del Pacífico. Another division of CORFO engaged in oil exploration making a breakthrough discovery in northern Tierra del Fuego in 1945. Extraction began in 1949 and in 1950 the state created ENAP (National Petroleum Company) to deal with oil extraction and prospection. Until 1960 most oil extracted in Chile came from Tierra del Fuego.

Industrial activity experienced enormous growth in the 1940s, it expanded at least 6.1% annually in that decade. The industries share of GDP rose from 16.7 to 23.7 in the 1940–1955 period. Starting in 1953 the growth rate of Chilean economy decreased to an annual average of 0.7% but increased to an annual average of 2.4–3.0% in the 1957–1960 period. The decline in the economic growth from 1953 onwards was variously attributed to excessive state intervention, neglect of agriculture and mining, unequal wealth distribution and dependency on state intervention.

The agrarian production in Chile contracted from 1950 onwards. A government plan set up in 1954 to address this ended with meager results and in 1958 a new plan was presented.

=== Structural reforms (1958–1970) ===
The 1958 agriculture plan allowed CORFO to develop investments in dairy plants, refrigerated slaughterhouses, sugar refineries and transport infrastructure.

=== Statism and collectivism (1970–1973) ===
Salvador Allende won the 1970 Chilean presidential election as leader of the Unidad Popular ("Popular Unity") coalition. His economic policy included a number of measures referred to as the Vuskovic Plan. Under this the Chilean copper mines were nationalized. Their revenue represent a large share of the Chilean government budget revenue.

During 1972, the macroeconomic problems continued to mount. Inflation surpassed 200 percent, and the fiscal deficit surpassed 13 percent of GDP. Domestic credit to the public sector grew at almost 300 percent, and international reserves dipped below US$77 million. Real wages fell 25 percent in 1972. By 1973, the economy was in recession.

At the same time, the United States cut off foreign aid and conducted a campaign to overthrow Allende.

== Neoliberal reforms (1973–1990) ==
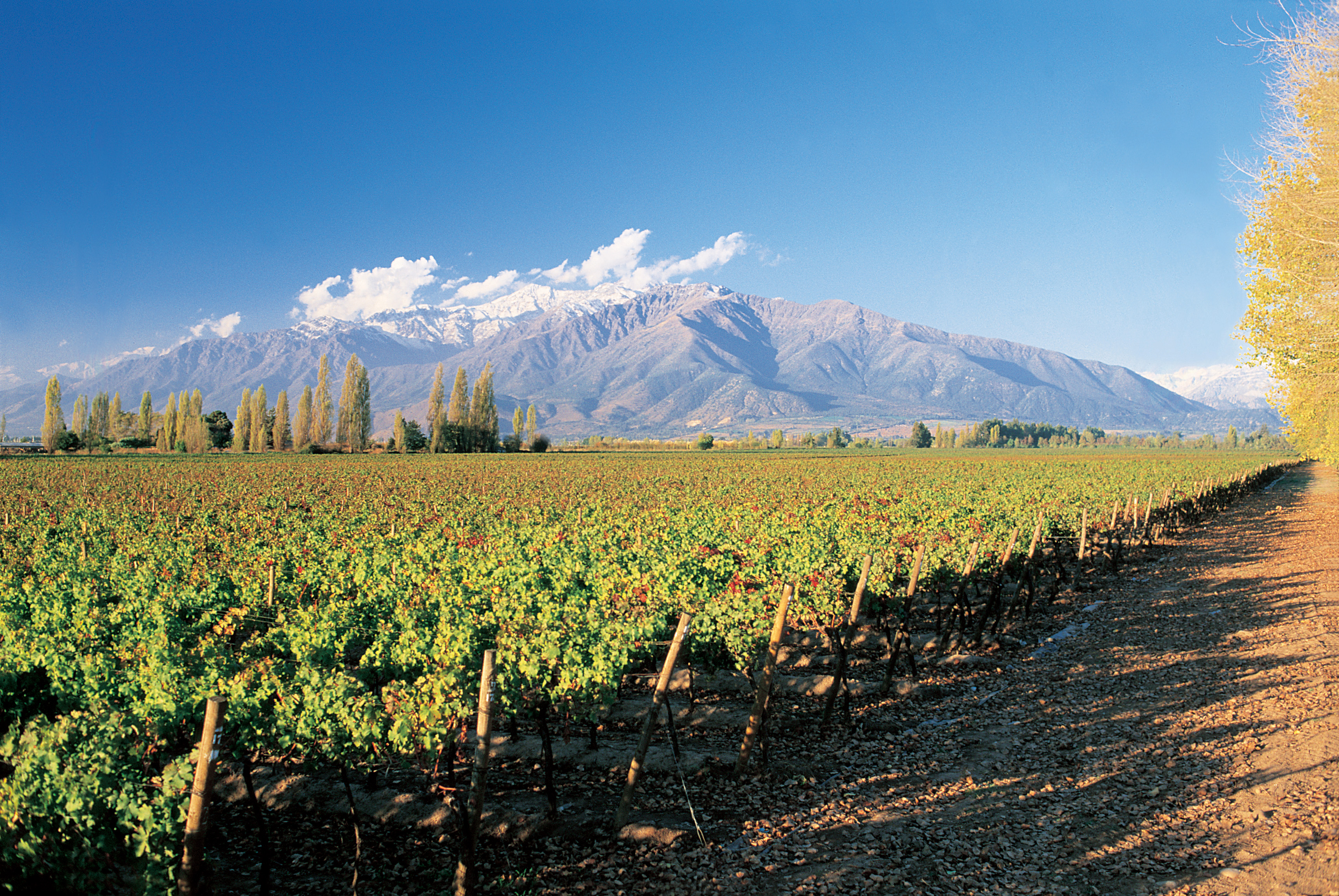
Image of Chilean vineyard in the foothills of the Andes near Santiago. Chile is now the fifth largest exporter of wines in the world, and the ninth largest producer.

From an economic point of view, the era can be divided into two periods. The first, from 1973 to the Crisis of 1982, corresponds to the period when most of the reforms were implemented. The period ended with the international debt crisis and the collapse of the Chilean economy. At that point, unemployment was extremely high, above 20 percent, and a large proportion of the banking sector had become bankrupt. During that first period, an economic policy that emphasized export expansion was implemented. Some economists argue that the economic recovery of the second period, from 1982 to 1990, was due to Pinochet's nationalisation of banks and reintroduction to the private market in 1984.

=== Monetarist shock therapy and "seven modernizations" (1973–1982) ===
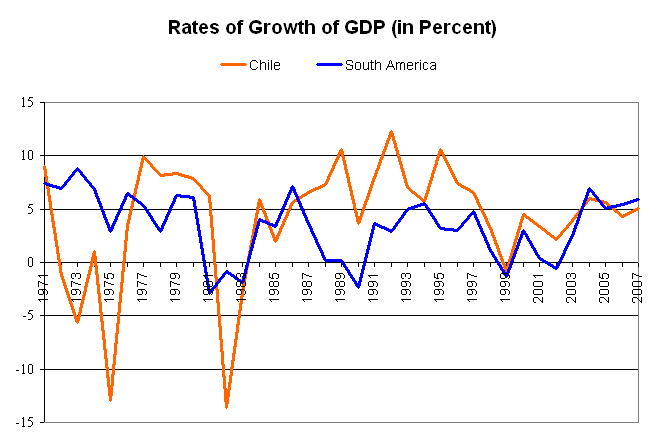
Chilean (orange) and average Latin American (blue) rates of growth of GDP (1971–2007).

After the military took over the government in 1973, a period of dramatic economic changes began. The military junta appointed a group of Chilean economists who had been educated in the United States at the University of Chicago. The Chicago Boys advocated laissez-faire, free-market, neoliberal, and fiscally conservative policies, in stark contrast to the extensive nationalization and centrally-planned economic programs supported by Allende, and the import substitution industrialization and structuralist economics supported by Chilean governments since the Great Depression. In a shock therapy, Chile was drastically transformed from an economy with a protected market, with strong government intervention, into a liberalized, world-integrated economy, where market forces were left free to guide most of the economy's decisions. Before 1973 the role of the state was to promote investment and industrialization. The Chicago Boys restricted government intervention and public enterprise activities. Businesses and lands expropriated during the presidency of Allende were re-privatized (with the exception of the copper mines). Price controls were abolished, import liberalized, the financial market and capital flows were deregulated. Labor unions were suppressed. Direct taxes and progressive taxes were reduced or abolished while indirect taxes were raised. The central bank raised interest rates from 49.9% to 178%. Thereby inflation could be lowered at the expected price of a sharp recession. When unemployment doubled some public work programmes were installed.

Year	1973	1974	1975	1976	1977	1978	1979	1980	1981	1982
Inflation (%)	508.1	376.0	340.0	174.0	63.5	30.3	38.9	31.2	9.5	20.7

Initial support by the business community dried out when contractionary monetary policies and hasty liberalizations caused a drop in manufacturing output of 26% in 1975. The first period advocating a Monetarist shock therapy and “seven Modernisations” is marked by a high rate of business bankruptcies and a significant loss of manufacturing share of GDP. The Chicago Boys argued that this was due to a lack of competitiveness caused by the development strategy supported before 1973. Chilean economist Ricardo Ffrench-Davis counters that the cause for those bankruptcies cannot necessarily be addressed to outright inefficiencies since the severe recessions (around 1973, 1975 and 1981), real interest rates at an average of 38%, hasty import liberalization and an artificially high exchange rate revaluation were the decisive factors of business mortality.

After the recession of 1975 the economy expanded from 1977 to 1980 with high growth rates. It made Chile a showcase for Monetarists and economic liberals. Milton Friedman called it in his Newsweek column from January 25, 1982, a Miracle of Chile. Nevertheless, the economic growth rate of the whole 1975–1980 period was below the potential Chilean growth rate.

The boom ended in the economic crisis of 1982. The Latin American debt crisis had a devastating impact on every Latin American country, but Chile was hit hardest with a GDP declined by 14%, while Latin American GDP diminished by 3.2% within the same period. Besides the Petrodollar recycling and the 1979 energy crisis there were some specific Chilean reasons for the crisis too. The Chicago Boys had expected that since the government had achieved a fiscal surplus and the decision for external borrowing was left to private agents a foreign exchange crisis would not occur. But in an effort to fight inflation Dollarization was introduced which lead to a Peso revaluation that caused high current account deficits which led to an increase in foreign lending. Additionally capital controls were abandoned and the financial market deregulated which led to an undamped increase in private foreign borrowing. The debt crisis led to a bank run which led to an economic crisis.

With the economic crisis of 1982, the "monetarist experiment" came to be widely regarded as a failure.

=== Pragmatic neoliberalism (1982–1990) ===
Finance minister Sergio de Castro rejected a competitive devaluation of the Peso even in 1982 despite a quickly growing rate of business bankruptcies. He argued that only the strongest and fittest should survive, but with a deepening financial and economic crisis that position became unbearable and he had to resign. The economic crisis of 1981 led to the replacement of all the Chicago Boys. Pragmatic economists had to socialize the two biggest Chilean banks in 1982 and another seven collapsing banks in 1983. The Central Bank of Chile socialized much of the foreign debt. The public expenditure quota rose above 34%, even higher than during the presidency of socialist Salvador Allende.

The pragmatic Chicago Boy Hernán Büchi was appointed as finance minister in 1985. He revived Bank regulation by founding the Superintendencia de Bancos e Instituciones Financieras (SBIF) and established capital controls to avoid another financial crisis. He also established ProChile, a Chilean government agency specialized in the promotion of exports. A further promotion of exports were fostered by cheap government credit and subsidies. Some tariffs were raised up to 35%. The socialized banks and some profitable public companies were re-privatized.

The pragmatic economic policy after the crisis of 1982 is appreciated for bringing constant economic growth.

== Concertación era (1990–2010) ==
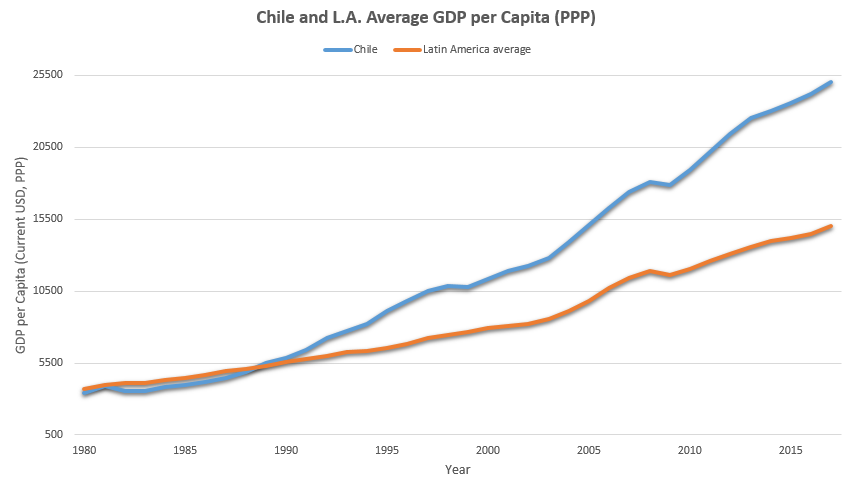
Gross domestic product per capita at constant PPP prices, 1950–2017. Latin America in orange, and Chile in blue (PPP, Current international dollars).

After the return to democracy, the Presidents Patricio Aylwin (1990–1993) and Eduardo Frei Ruiz-Tagle (1994–1999) avoided radical change in favour of a “change in continuity”. To raise the lower income groups the share of government social spending was raised and a tax reform increased fiscal income. In 1990 the labor code was reformed with the aim to legitimate unions in order to balance the bargaining powers of employers and employees. Also in 1990 a tripartite agreement between government, unions and employers provided for an increase in the real minimum wage of 28% until 1993. In the first half of the 1990s a significant success on poverty reduction and a bit more equitable income distribution was achieved.

poverty rate (%).
1987	1990	1992	1994	1996	1998	2000
45.1	38.6	32.6	27.5	23.3	21.7	20.6

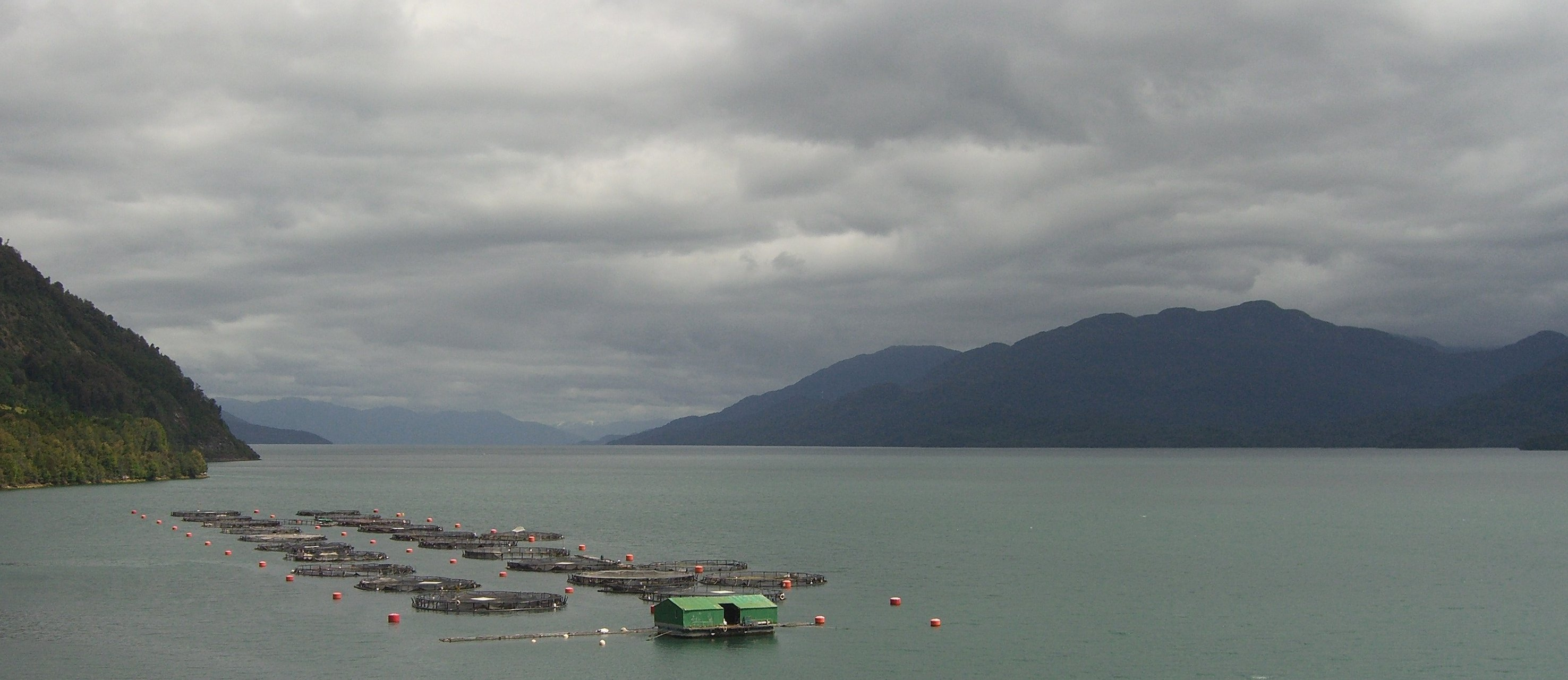
Fishfarm in Fjord near La Junta, 2009. Chile is the second largest producer of salmon in the world.

Capital controls such as a reserve requirement for foreign loans and a tax on foreign currency loans helped to prevent another financial crisis when many southern American countries suffered from the impact of the Tequila crisis. Nevertheless, the capital controls were not adapted to the disproportionate real appreciation of the peso and excessive capital inflows in 1996–1997. Thus Chile was affected by the 1997 Asian financial crisis and witnessed a financial and economic crisis, albeit a relatively short one.

== See also ==
- Economy of Chile
- Chilean nationalization of copper
- The Shock Doctrine
- Economic history of Latin America

== Bibliography ==
- Bengoa, José (2000). Historia del pueblo mapuche: Siglos XIX y XX (in Spanish) (Seventh ed.). LOM ediciones. ISBN 956-282-232-X.
- Guarda, Gabriel (1973). La economía de Chile Austral antes de la colonización alemana. Valdivia: Universidad Austral de Chile.
- Otero, Luis (2006). La huella del fuego: Historia de los bosques nativos. Poblamiento y cambios en el paisaje del sur de Chile. Pehuén Editores. ISBN 956-16-0409-4.
- Salazar, Gabriel (1985). Labradores, Peones y Proletarios (3rd ed.). LOM Ediciones. ISBN 956-282-269-9.
- Salazar, Gabriel; Pinto, Julio (2002). Historia contemporánea de Chile III. La economía: mercados empresarios y trabajadores. LOM Ediciones. ISBN 956-282-172-2.
- Villalobos, Sergio; Silva, Osvaldo; Silva, Fernando; Estelle, Patricio (1974). Historia De Chile (14th ed.). Editorial Universitaria. ISBN 956-11-1163-2.
- Bulnes, Gonzalo (1920). Chile and Peru: the causes of the war of 1879. Santiago, Chile: Imprenta Universitaria.
- Sater, William F. (2007). Andean Tragedy: Fighting the War of the Pacific, 1879–1884. Lincoln and London: University of Nebraska Press. ISBN 978-0-8032-4334-7.
- Farcau, Bruce W. (2000). The Ten Cents War, Chile, Peru and Bolivia in the War of the Pacific, 1879–1884. Westport, Connecticut, London: Praeger Publishers. ISBN 978-0-275-96925-7.
