= Colonial Chile =

Period of Chilean history from 1600 to 1810

In Chilean historiography, Colonial Chile (Spanish: La colonia) is the period from 1600 to 1810, beginning with the Destruction of the Seven Cities and ending with the onset of the Chilean War of Independence. During this time, the Chilean heartland was ruled by Captaincy General of Chile. The period was characterized by a lengthy conflict between Spaniards and Native Mapuches known as the Arauco War. Colonial society was divided in distinct groups including Peninsulars, Criollos, Mestizos, Indians and Black people.

Relative to other Spanish colonies, Chile was a "poor and dangerous" place. (Note: While not falling in the sensu stricto colonial period the inhabitants of Santiago in the mid-16th century were notoriously poorly dressed as result of a lack of supplies with some Spanish even resorting to dress with hides from dogs, cats, sea lions and foxes.)

== Society ==
=== Societal groups ===
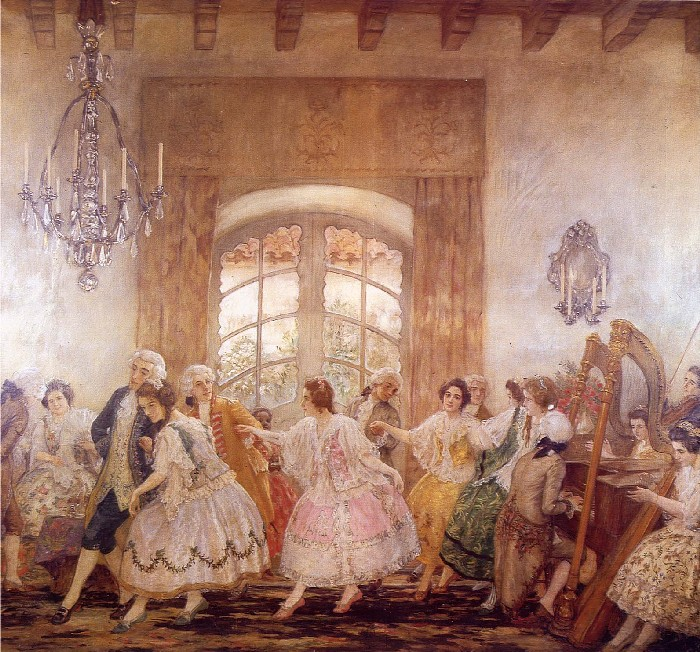
"Baile del Santiago antiguo" by Pedro Subercaseaux. Chile's colonial high society were made up by landowners and government officials.

The Chilean colonial society was based on a caste system. Local of criollos (American-born Spaniards) enjoyed privileges such as the ownership of encomiendas (Indian labour jurisdictions). Moreover, they were allowed to access some public charges like corregidor or alférez. Mestizos initially made up a small group. In time, they made up the bulk of Chilean society, becoming more numerous than indigenous peoples. Mestizos were not a homogeneous group and were judged more by appearance than by actual ancestry. Indigenous people enjoyed the lowest prestige among societal groups in colonial Chile; many of them were used as cheap labour in encomienda but their numbers decreased over time due to diseases and miscegenation. Pehuenche, Huilliche, and Mapuche living south of La Frontera were not part of the colonial society since they were outside the de facto borders of Chile.

Spanish agriculture, centered on the hacienda, absorbed most of the scattered and declining indigenous populations of Central Chile. Thus populations that had previously lived apart in their own villages (pueblo de indios) from their Spanish masters begun to live in Spanish estancias. In Central Chile the dwindling population of Picunche occurred in parallel to import of Mapuche and Huilliche slaves from Araucanía and Chiloé, (Note: It is possible that slaves exported from Chiloé included some few Chono and Poya.) as well as the arrival of indigenous people from Peru, Tucumán and the transfer of encomienda Huarpes from Cuyo. This mix of disparate populations cohabitating with the Spanish contributed to the loss of indigenous identities.

For many years, Spanish-descent settlers and religious orders imported African slaves to the country, which in the early 19th century constituted 1.5% of the national population. Despite this, the Afro-Chilean population was negligible, reaching a height of only 2,500 – or 0.1% of the total population – during the colonial period. While a minority black slaves had special status due to their high cost of import and maintenance. Black slaves were often used as housekeepers and other posts of confidence. Peninsulares, Spaniards born in Spain, were a rather small group in late colonial times, some of them came as government officials and some other as merchants. Their role in high government positions in Chile led to resentment among local criollos. Mixing of different groups was not uncommon although marriage between members of the different groups was rare.

During late colonial times, new migration pulses took off leading to large numbers of Basque people settling in Chile mingling with landowning criollos, forming a new upper class. Scholar Luis Thayer Ojeda estimates that during the 17th and 18th centuries fully 45% of all immigrants in Chile were Basques. Compared to other Spanish colonies in the Americas the proportion of women among and merchants among Spanish immigrants to Chile were lower and the proportion of non-Spanish immigrants (e.g. French, Irish) higher.

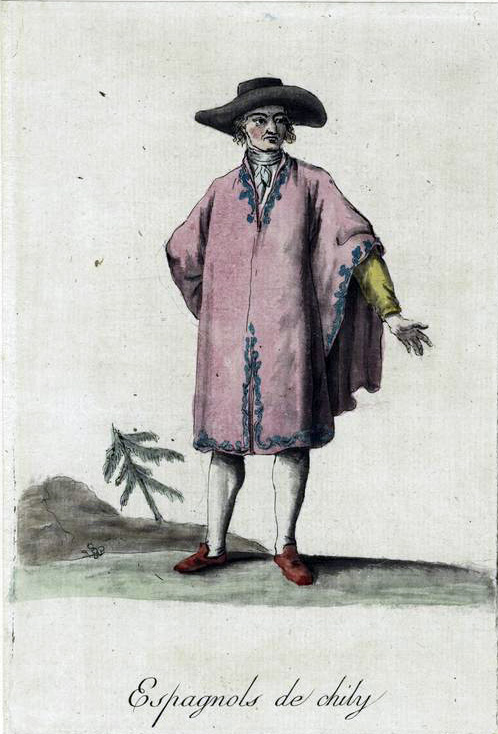
Spaniard in Chile in the 18th century

In 1812, the Diocese of Concepción conducted a census to the south of the Maule river, however, this did not include the indigenous population – at that time estimated at 8,000 people – nor the inhabitants of the province of Chiloé. It put the total population at 210,567, of which 86.1% was native Spaniards and 10% were Indian, with a remaining 3.7% of Africans, mulattos, and mestizo descent. Other estimates in the late 17th century indicate that the population reached a maximum total of 152,000, consisting of 72% whites and mestizos, 18% Indians, and 10% blacks and mulattos.

=== Sex and marriage ===
Indigenous women in the colonial society were noted, from a Spanish point of view, for their sexual liberalism and engaged often sexually with men from other ethnicities. The same was true for the black slaves who due to their "many" intercourses with other groups were strictly prohibited by law to engage in sexual activities with other ethnicities in order to avoid the proliferation of black individuals.

16th century Spaniards are generally known to have been pessimistic about marriage. Many of the initial conquistadores had left their wives in Spain and engaged in adultery in Chile. An example of this is Pedro de Valdivia who held Inés de Suárez as lover. Adultery was explicitly forbidden for Catholics and the Council of Trent (1545–1563) made the climate prone for accusations of adultery. Over the course of the 16th, 17th and 18th centuries marital fidelity increased in Chile.

== Political organization ==
Territory legally belonging (with or without effective control) to the Captaincy General or Kingdom of Chile in 1810 highlighting the historiographical disputes surrounding it, as well as the Araucanía, a territory under indigenous self-government that belongs to Chile. In 1776 the Viceroyalty of the Río de la Plata was created and the territories of the cities of Mendoza and San Juan got transferred to the new entity.

The government of Chile or Nueva Toledo was created by Emperor Charles V in 1534 and placed under the governorship of Diego de Almagro. It ran south from 14° S to 25° S latitude, as far south as present-day Taltal. Capitanía General de Chile, or Gobernación de Chile, remained a colony of the Spanish Empire until 1818 when it declared itself independent. In the mid Eighteenth Century, the Bourbon administrative reforms divided Chile into intendencias (provinces) and further into partidos (counties) which were also known by the older term of corregimientos. The partidos were further divided into distritos (districts) akin to Chile's modern communes. In 1786 two intendencias were created: Santiago and Concepción. By the end of the 18th century, Santiago was divided into thirteen partidos.

Partido	Administrative centre
Santiago	Ciudad de Santiago del Nuevo Extremo
Copiapó	Villa de San Francisco de la Selva
Huasco	Villa de Santa Rosa del Huasco
Coquimbo	Ciudad de San Bartolomé de la Serena
Cuzcúz	Villa de San Rafael de Rozas
Quillota	Villa de San Martín de la Concha
Valparaíso	Puerto de Valparaíso
Aconcagua	Villa de San Felipe el Real
Melipilla	Villa de San José de Logroño
Rancagua	Villa de Santa Cruz de Triana
Colchagua	Villa de San Fernando el Real de Tinguiririca
Curicó	Villa de San José de la Buenavista
Maule	Villa de San Agustín de Talca

The intendencia of Concepcion had six partidos: Cauquenes, Chillán, Itata, Rere, Laja, and Puchacay. A third intendencia, Coquimbo was created in 1810. The area of Chiloé may be considered a fourth intendencia, but instead of reporting to the governor/capitain it reported directly to the viceroy, beginning in 1777. The intendencia, partido and distrito system was replaced in 1822 with departamentos, distritos and cabildos.

== Labor forms ==
=== Encomienda ===
Beyond subsistence, the 16th century economy of Chile was oriented towards large-scale production. Spanish colonizers used large amounts of indigenous labour following the slave labour system used in the sugar cane plantations of the Mediterranean islands and Macaronesia. This system of labour successively killed the production base leading to the imposition of the encomienda system by the Spanish Crown in order to prevent excesses. In Chile Spanish settlers managed to continue to exploit indigenous labour under slave like conditions despite the implementation of the encomienda. Rich Spanish settlers had over time to face opposition to their mode of production by Jesuits, Spanish officials and indigenous Mapuches.

Over the course of the 17th century, the indigenous population of Chile declined making the encomiendas less and less important. Chilean encomenderos who had encomiendas in Cuyo, across the Andes, introduced to Chile indigenous Huarpes who they hired to other Spanish without encomiendas.

The encomienda system was abolished in 1782 in Chiloé, in 1789 in the rest of Chile and in 1791 in the whole Spanish Empire.

=== Formal slavery ===
The Spanish were familiar with the institution of slavery. In the Mediterranean islands and Macaronesia the Spanish and Portuguese had a slave labour system used in sugar cane plantations. In the Iberian Peninsula slavery was declining did still occur in the 16th century. The import of black slaves into Chile was a response to a long-term population decline among indigenous peoples. Slavery was a legal labour form in Chile from 1536 to 1823 but it was never the dominant way of arranging labour. Slavery of black people bloomed from 1580 to 1660. The end of the boom is associated to the Portuguese Restoration War and Portugal's loss of several slave trading posts in Africa.

Formal slavery of indigenous people was prohibited by the Spanish Crown. The 1598–1604 Mapuche uprising that ended with the Destruction of the Seven Cities made the Spanish in 1608 declare slavery legal for those Mapuches caught in war. Rebelling Mapuches were considered Christian apostates and could therefore be enslaved according to the church teachings of the day. This legal change formalized Mapuche slavery that was already occurring at the time, with captured Mapuches being treated as property in the way that they were bought and sold among the Spanish. Legalisation made Spanish slave raiding increasingly common in the Arauco War. Mapuche slaves were exported north to La Serena and Lima. Slavery for Mapuches "caught in war" was abolished in 1683 after decades of legal attempts by the Spanish Crown to suppress it. By that time free mestizo labour had become significantly cheaper than ownership of slaves which made Mario Góngora in 1966 conclude that economic factors were behind the abolition.

== Economy ==
Location Spanish settlements in late colonial times within the boundaries of Chile of 1775. Color of dots shows the date since the settlements have been in continuous existence. 16th century: red dots. 17th century: blue dots. 18th century: yellow dots. Red circles shows areas of indigenous resistance to Spanish penetration by the late 18th century.

The collapse of the Spanish cities in the south following the battle of Curalaba (1598) meant for the Spaniards the loss of both the main gold districts and the largest indigenous labour sources. After those dramatic years the colony of Chile became concentrated in the central valley which became increasingly populated, explored and economically exploited. Following a tendency common in the whole Spanish America haciendas were formed as the economy moved away from mining and into agriculture and husbandry.

In the 1650–1800 period, the Chilean lower classes grew considerably in size. To deal with the poor and landless population a policy of founding cities (Note: These cities were often in fact more of villages or towns due to their size.) and granting lands in their surroundings was implemented. From 1730 to 1820 a large number of farmers settled in the outskirts of old cities or formed new cities. Settling as a farmer in the outskirts of old cities (La Serena, Valparaíso, Santiago and Concepción) was overall more popular than joining a new city since it secured a larger consumer market for agricultural products. Chilean haciendas (latifundia) engaged little in the supply of Chilean cities but focused on international exports for revenues.

Haciendas of central Chile are believed to have become labour-saturated by 1780 generating an "excess" population that could not be incorporated into their economy. Some of this population settled in the outskirts of larger cities while other migrated to the mining districts of Norte Chico.

=== Agriculture ===
without Chile, Lima would not exist

— Viceroy José de Armendáriz in 1736

Chile began exporting cereals to Peru in 1687 when Peru was struck by both an earthquake and a stem rust epidemic. Chilean soil and climatic conditions were better for cereal production than those of Peru and Chilean wheat was cheaper and of better quality than Peruvian wheat. According to historians Villalobos et al. the 1687 events were only the detonant factor for exports to start. The Chilean Central Valley, La Serena and Concepción were the districts that came to be involved in cereal export to Peru. It should be pointed out that compared with the 19th century the area cultivated with wheat was very small and production modest.

Initially Chilean latifundia could not meet the wheat demand due to a labour shortage, so had to incorporate temporal workers in addition to the permanent staff. Another response by the latifundia to labour shortages was to act as merchants buying wheat produced by independent farmers or from farmers that hired land. In the period 1700 to 1850 this second option was overall more lucrative.

The 1687 Peru earthquake also ended a Peruvian wine-boom as the earthquake destroyed wine cellars and mud containers used for wine storage. The gradual decline of Peruvian wine even caused Peru to import some wine from Chile as it happened in 1795 when Lima imported 5.000 troves (Spanish: botijas) from Concepción in southern Chile. This particular export showed the emergence of Chile relative to Peru as a wine-making region.

=== Mining ===
Compared to the 16th and 18th centuries, Chilean mining activity in the 17th century was very limited. Chile saw an unprecedented revival of its mining activity in the 18th century with annual gold production rising from 400 to 1000 kg over the course of the century and the silver annual production rising from 1000 to 5000 kg in the same interval.

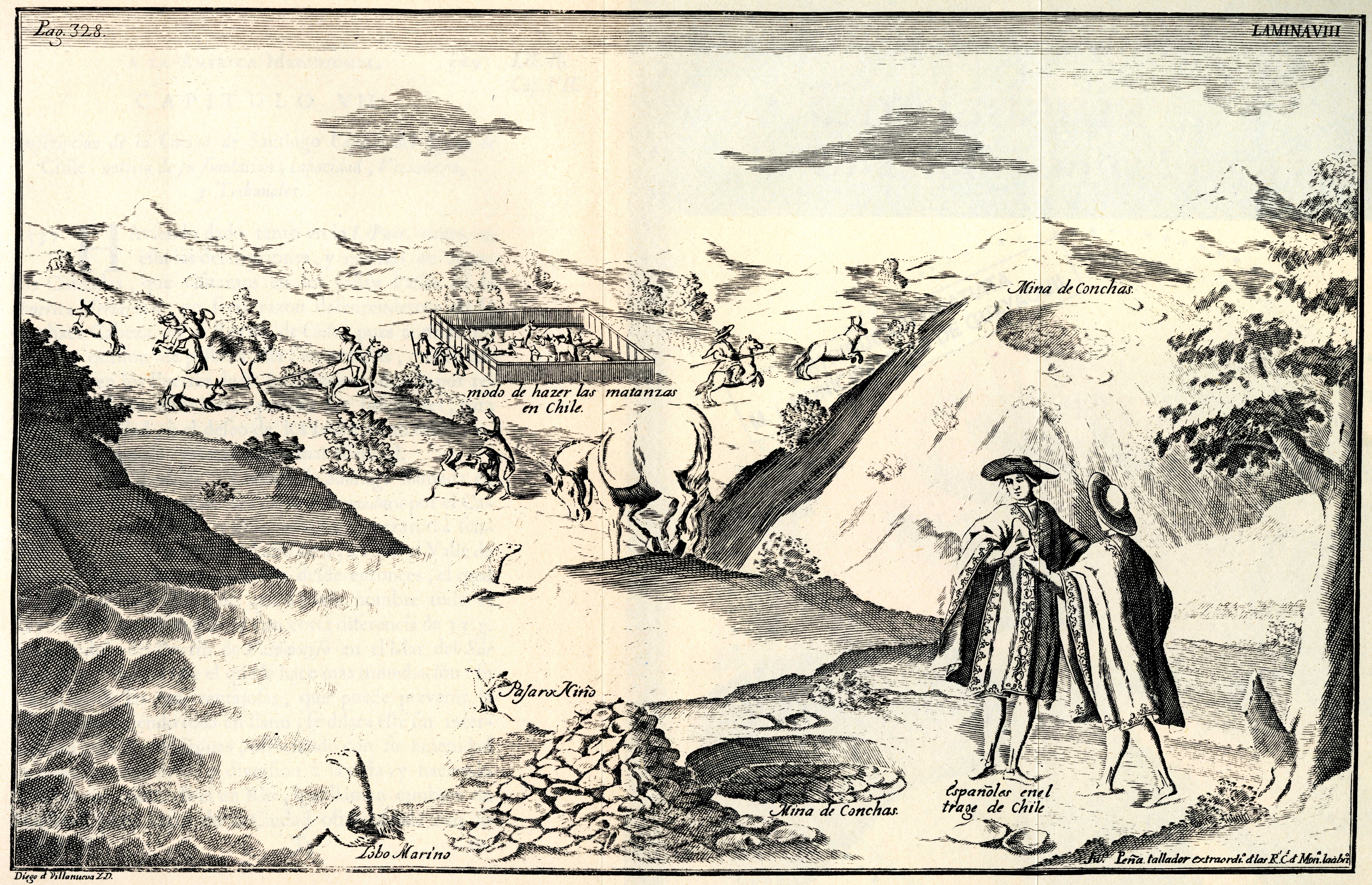
1744 engraving published in Relación histórica del viaje a la América meridional. The image shows cattle in the Chilean countryside including a square for cattle slaughter.

=== Trade ===
In the 17th century, economy of the Viceroyalty of Peru, Chile's husbandry and agriculture based economy had a peripheral role, contrasting to ore-rich districts like Potosí and the wealthy city of Lima. Husbandry products made up the bulk of Chilean exports to the rest of the viceroyalty. These products included suet, charqui and leather. This trade made Chilean historian Benjamín Vicuña Mackenna label the 17th century the century of suet (Spanish: Siglo del sebo). Other products exported included dry fruits, mules, wines and minor amounts of copper. Trade with Peru was controlled by merchants from Lima that not only managed also the trade with Chile and Panama but also enjoyed protection by the authorities in Lima. In addition to the exports to coastal Peru Chile also exported products inland to Upper Peru through the port of Arica. Trade inside Chile was small since cities were tiny and self-sufficient.

Direct trade with Spain over the Straits of Magellan and Buenos Aires begun first in the 18th century constituting primarily an export route for gold, silver and copper from Chilean mining. By the same time Spains trade monopoly with its colonies was successively weakened by smugglers from England, France and United States.

=== Alerce logging ===
Generally, the extraction of wood had little importance in colonial Chile but Chiloé Archipelago and Valdivia were exceptions. These two areas exported planks to Peru. With the destruction of Valdivia in 1599 Chiloé gained increased importance as the only locale that could supply the Vice royalty of Peru with Fitzroya wood. In 1641 the first large shipment of Fitzroya wood left Chiloé.

=== Shipbuilding ===
In the 18th century the shipbuilding industry in Valdivia, one of the city's main economic activities, reached its peak building numerous ships including frigates. Other shipyards of Chile included those of Concepción and Chiloé Archipelago. The Chiloé shipyards constructed he bulk of the ships in Chile until the mid-18th century. In 1794 a new shipyard was established the mouth of Maule River (present day Constitución). Despite some navigators expressing that Valdivia had better conditions than Guayaquil in Ecuador, this last port was the chief shipyard of the Spanish Empire in the Pacific.

== War and defense ==
=== Arauco War ===
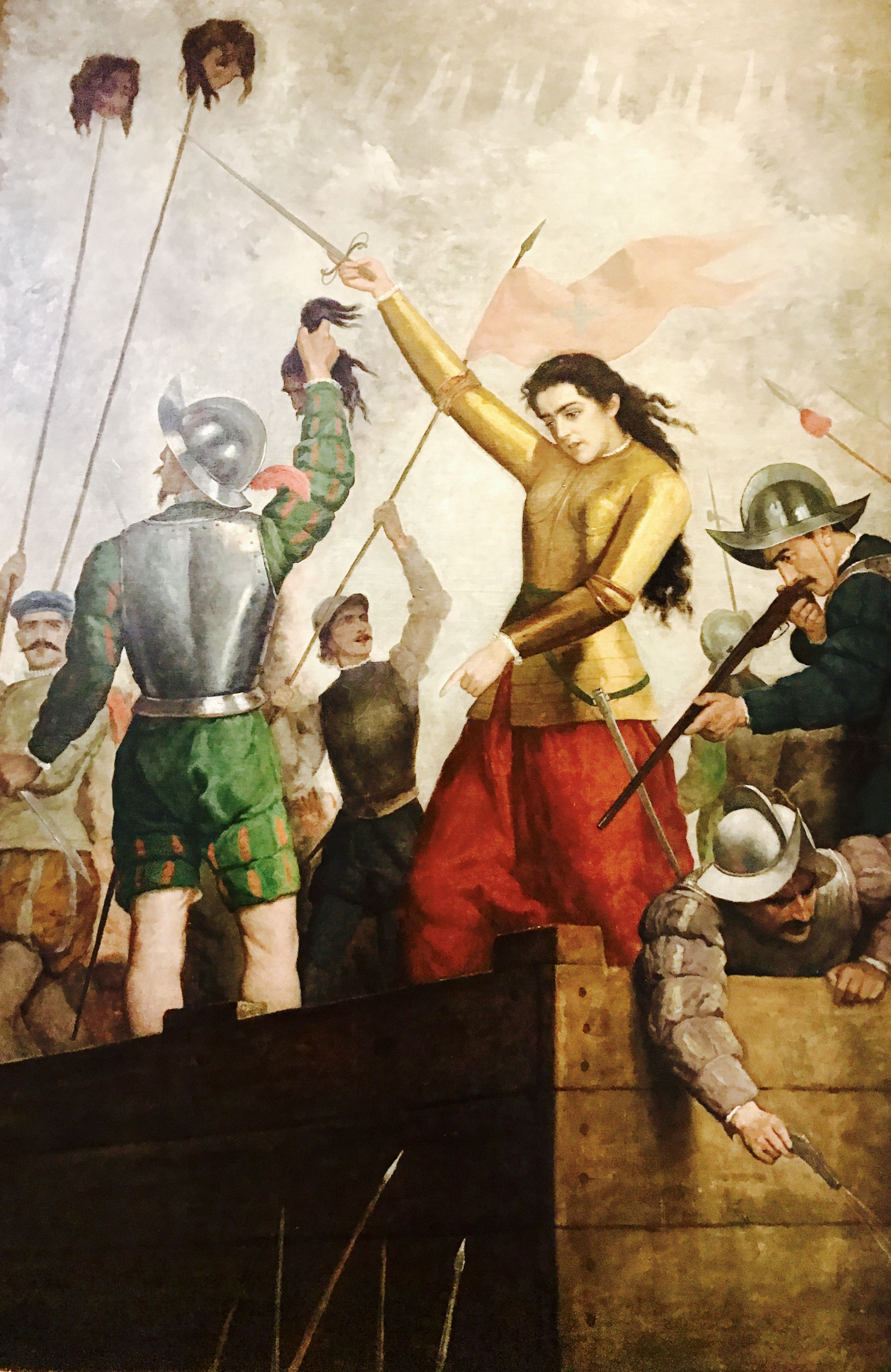
Doña Inés de Suárez in defending the city of Santiago

In 1550, Pedro de Valdivia, who aimed to control all of Chile to the Straits of Magellan, traveled southward to conquer Mapuche territory. Between 1550 and 1553 the Spanish founded several cities (Note: These "cities" were often in fact more forts than cities.) in Mapuche lands including Concepción, Valdivia, Imperial, Villarrica and Angol. The Spanish did also establish the forts of Arauco, Purén and Tucapel.

Following this initial conquest, the Arauco War, a long period of intermittent war, between Mapuches and Spaniards broke out. A contributing factor was the lack a tradition of forced labour like the Andean mita among the Mapuches who largely refused to serve the Spanish. On the other hand, the Spanish, in particular those from Castile and Extremadura, came from an extremely violent society. Since the Spanish arrival to the Araucanía in 1550 the Mapuches frequently laid siege to the Spanish cities in the 1550–1598 period. The war was mostly a low intensity conflict.

A watershed event happened in 1598. That year, a party of warriors from Purén were returning south from a raid against the surroundings of Chillán. In their way back home, they ambushed Martín García Óñez de Loyola and his troops that were sleeping without any night watch. It is not clear if they found the Spanish by accident or if they had followed them. The warriors, led by Pelantaro, killed both the governor and all his troops.

In the years following the Battle of Curalaba, a general uprising developed among the Mapuches and Huilliches. The Spanish cities of Angol, La Imperial, Osorno, Santa Cruz de Oñez, Valdivia and Villarrica were either destroyed or abandoned. Only Chillán and Concepción resisted the Mapuche sieges and attacks. With the exception of Chiloé Archipelago all the Chilean territory south of Bío Bío River became free of Spanish rule.

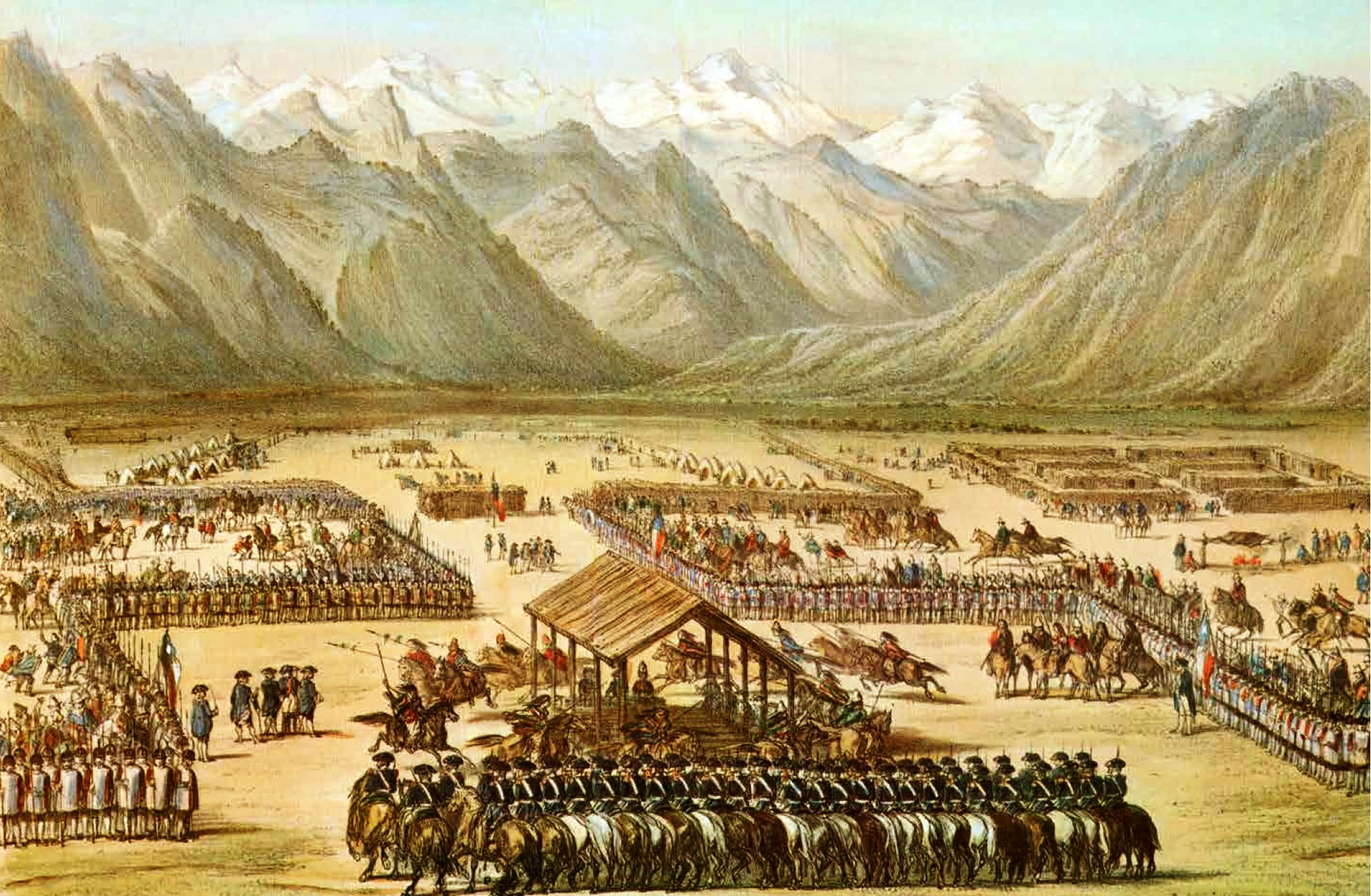
The 1793 parliament of Negrete

As the Spanish Empire faced a direct threat to its heartland in with the Catalan Revolt of 1640, all resources were put to crush the rebellion. With the Arauco War being a lengthy and costly conflict, the Spanish crown ordered its authorities in Chile to sign a peace agreement with the Mapuche in order to concentrate the empire's resources in fighting the Catalans. This way, the Mapuche obtained a peace treaty and a recognition on behalf of the crown in a case unique for any indigenous group in the Americas. This peace treaty did end the hostilities for a time, but they continued to flare up through the colonial era, most notably in 1655.

=== Pirates and corsairs ===
In Colonial times the Spanish Empire diverted significant resources to fortify the Chilean coast as consequence of Dutch and English raids.

In 1600, local Huilliche joined the Dutch corsair Baltazar de Cordes to attack the Spanish settlement of Castro. While this was a sporadic attack, the Spanish believed the Dutch could attempt to ally the Mapuches and establish a stronghold in southern Chile. The Spanish knew of the Dutch plans to establish themselves at the ruins of Valdivia so they attempted to re-establish Spanish rule there before the Dutch arrived again. The Spanish attempts were thwarted in the 1630s when Mapuches did not allow the Spanish to pass by their territory.

The Dutch occupation of Valdivia in 1643 caused great alarm among Spanish authorities and triggered the construction of the Valdivian Fort System that begun in 1645.

As consequence of the Seven Years' War, the Valdivian Fort System, a Spanish defensive complex in southern Chile, was rebuilt and reinforced from 1764 onwards. Other vulnerable localities of colonial Chile such as Chiloé Archipelago, Concepción, Juan Fernández Islands and Valparaíso were also made ready for an eventual English attack.

With Spain and Great Britain at war again in the 1770s due to the American Revolutionary War, local Spanish authorities in Chile received in 1779 the warning that a British fleet commanded by Edward Hughes was heading to Chilean coasts for an imminent attack. As consequence of this, the Viceroyalty of Peru sent economic aid to the garrisons at Valparaíso and Valdivia. The suspected attack did however never happen. In late 1788, suspicion of British attack rose appeared once again, this time stemming from observations of ships off the coast of Coquimbo.

== Bibliography ==
- Bengoa, José (2003). Historia de los antiguos mapuches del sur (in Spanish). Santiago: Catalonia. ISBN 956-8303-02-2.
- Guarda, Gabriel (1973). La economía de Chile Austral antes de la colonización alemana (in Spanish). Valdivia: Universidad Austral de Chile.
- Salazar, Gabriel (1985). Labradores, Peones y Proletarios (in Spanish) (3rd ed.). LOM Ediciones. ISBN 956-282-269-9.
- Salazar, Gabriel; Pinto, Julio (2002). Historia contemporánea de Chile III. La economía: mercados empresarios y trabajadores (in Spanish). LOM Ediciones. ISBN 956-282-172-2.
- Valenzuela Márquez, Jaime (2009). "Esclavos mapuches. Para una historia del secuestro y deportación de indígenas en la colonia". In Gaune, Rafael; Lara, Martín (eds.). Historias de racismo y discriminación en Chile (in Spanish).
- Villalobos, Sergio; Silva, Osvaldo; Silva, Fernando; Estelle, Patricio (1974). Historia de Chile (in Spanish) (14th ed.). Santiago de Chile: Editorial Universitaria. ISBN 956-11-1163-2.
