= Haenisch =

Haenisch is a surname. Notable people with the surname include:

- Erich Haenisch (1880–1966), German sinologist
- Konrad Haenisch (1876–1925), German politician
- Walter Haenisch (1906–1938), German Marxist theoretician

== See also ==
- Hanisch
