= Chilean National History Award =

Part of the National Prize of Chile

The Chilean National History Award (Spanish: Premio Nacional de Historia), part of the National Prize of Chile, is an award given for contributions to the historiography of Chilean history. It was first awarded in 1974, is given every two years, and includes a sum of 13,186,565 Chilean pesos plus a pension of 20 Unidad Tributaria Mensual.

== Award winners ==
Source: National Library of Chile

- 1974 - Eugenio Pereira Salas
- 1976 - Mario Góngora
- 1978 - Juan Luis Espejo
- 1980 - Néstor Meza
- 1982 - Ricardo Krebs
- 1984 - Gabriel Guarda
- 1986 - Rolando Mellafe Rojas
- 1988 - Fernando Campos Harriet
- 1990 - Álvaro Jara
- 1992 - Sergio Villalobos
- 1994 - Mario Orellana
- 1996 - Wálter Hanisch
- 1998 - José Armando de Ramón
- 2000 - Mateo Martinic
- 2002 - Lautaro Núñez Atencio
- 2004 - Jorge Hidalgo
- 2006 - Gabriel Salazar
- 2008 - Eduardo Cavieres
- 2010 - Bernardino Bravo Lira
- 2012 - Jorge Pinto Rodríguez
- 2014 - Sergio González Miranda
- 2016 - Julio Pinto
- 2018 - Sol Serrano
- 2020 - Ivan Jaksic
- 2022 - Rafael Sagredo

== See also ==
- List of history awards
