= Walter Hanisch =

Chilean Jesuit and historian

- Born: 1916
- Died: October 13, 2001 (aged 84–85)
- Awards: Chilean National History Award
- Scientific career
- Fields: History of Chiloé, Jesuit history, colonial history of Chile, ecclesiastical history

Walter Hanisch Espindola (1916 - October 13, 2001) was a Chilean Jesuit and historian. He had a doctorate in theology from the Pontifical Catholic University of Chile.
