= Hanisch =

Hanisch is a German surname. Notable people with the surname include:

- Carol Hanisch (born 1942), American feminist
- Cornelia Hanisch (born 1952), German fencer
- Erich Hanisch (1909–?), German sprint canoeist
- Frank Hanisch (born 1953), German footballer
- Karl von Hänisch (1861–1921), German general
- Karl Hanisch (1900–?), Austrian fencer
- Klaus-Peter Hanisch (1952–2009), German footballer
- Otto Hanisch, Herman cinematographer
- Reinhold Hanisch (1884–1937), Austrian painter and acquaintance of Adolf Hitler
- Ted Hanisch (born 1947), Norwegian sociologist
- Walter Hanisch (1916–2001), Chilean Jesuit and historian
- Wolfgang Hanisch (born 1951), East German javelin thrower
