= Fernando Campos Harriet =

Chilean lawyer and historian

Fernando Campos Harriet (1910–2003) was a Chilean lawyer and historian. He won Chile's National Prize for History in 1988.
