= Néstor Meza =

Chilean historian

Néstor Meza Villalobos (1913–1993) was a Chilean historian who received the Chilean National History Award in 1980.
