= Álvaro Jara =

Chilean historian

Álvaro Jara (16 June 1923 – 20 April 1998) was a Chilean historian who won the National History Award in 1990.

His major work is War and Society in Chile, which was not originally published in Chile but in France with the title of Guerre et société au Chili in 1961. This work included a new view on the themes of the conquest of Chile.

== Works ==
- Pineda and Bascuñan man of his time (1954)
- Chilean Indian Law (1956)
- The salary of the Indians and the gold sesmos Rate Santillan (1961)
- Guerre et société au Chili (1961) (Spanish version War and Society in Chile in 1971)
- Sources for the history of labor in the Kingdom of Chile (1965)
- Three essays on Latin American mining economy (1966)
- Captivity and happy individual reason dilated wars of the Kingdom of Chile (1973)
- Indigenous Employment and wage sixteenth century (1987)
