= Compañía Electro-Siderúrgica e Industrial de Valdivia =

The Compañía Electro-Siderúrgica e Industrial de Valdivia also known by its acronyms ESVAL is an iron and steel industry located at Valdivia in Chile. The enterprise is considered the inheritor of Altos Hornos y Acerías de Corral whose infrastructure it bought in 1926 when it was created by entrepreneurs from Valdivia.
