= Julio Pinto =

Chilean historian

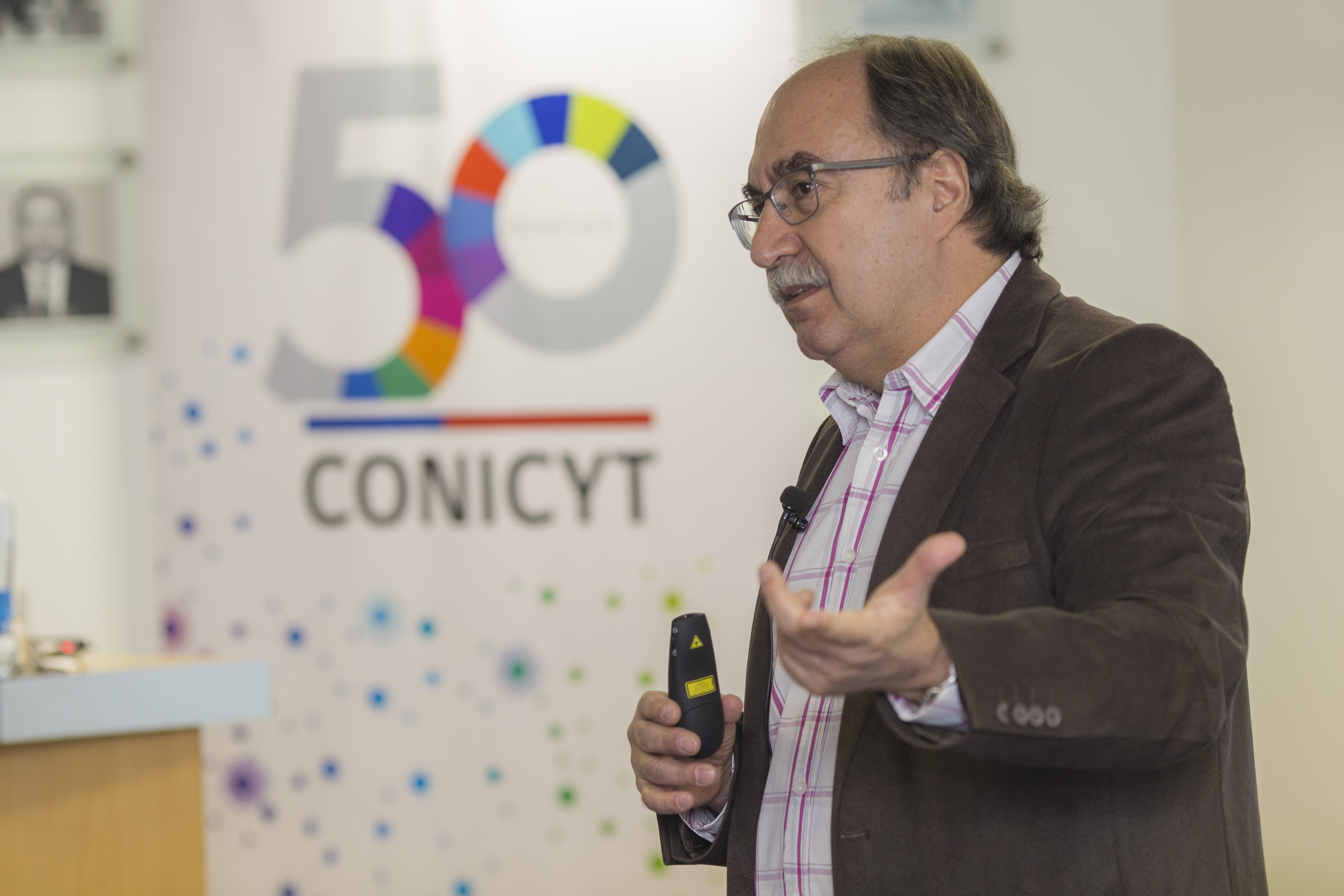
- Portrait of Julio Pinto
- Born: 1956 (age 69–70)
- Education: Yale University
- Awards: Santiago Municipal Literature Award (2000); Chilean National History Award (2016)
- Scientific career
- Fields: History of Chile, social history

Julio Pinto Vallejos (born 1956) is a Chilean historian. He is known in Chile for his study of social history and interpretations of social movements. In 2016 he won the Chilean National History Award. He is a member of the editorial board of LOM Ediciones.

Pinto completed his higher education at Yale University, where he obtained his bachelor's, master's and doctoral degrees, specialising in contemporary Latin America.

Since 1980, he has worked as an academic at the universities of Talca, ARCIS, Católica de Chile, and the University of Santiago. At the latter, he has held management positions for decades. He has also taught at the Federal University of Minas Gerais and the São Paulo State University in Brazil, University of the Republic in Uruguay, and the Graduate Institute of International and Development Studies in Switzerland.

== Bibliography ==
- Cien anos de propuestas y combates. La historiografía chilena del siglo XX. México: Universidad Autónoma Metropolitana.
- Expansión minera y desarrollo industrial :un caso de crecimiento asociado (Chile 1850–1914), Santiago, Universidad de Santiago, 1990 (coauthored with Luis Ortega).
- Trabajos y rebeldías en la pampa salitrera: el ciclo del salitre y la reconfiguración de las identidades populares (1850–1900), Santiago, Universidad de Santiago, 1998.
- Expansión minera y desarrollo industrial :un caso de crecimiento asociado (Chile 1850–1914), Santiago, Universidad de Santiago, 1990 (coauthored with Luis Ortega).
- Desgarros y utopías en la pampa salitrera: la consolidación de la identidad obrera en tiempos de la cuestión social (1890–1923), Santiago, LOM Ediciones, 2007.
- ¿Chilenos todos? La construcción social de la nación (1810–1840), Santiago, Lom Ediciones, 2009 (coauthored with Verónica Valdivia).
- ¿Revolución proletaria o querida chusma? Socialismo y Alessandrismo en la pugna por la politización pampina (1911–1932), Santiago, LOM Ediciones, 2001 (coauthored with Verónica Valdivia).
- Luis Emilio Recabarren. Una biografía histórica, Santiago, LOM Ediciones, 2013.
- El orden y el bajo pueblo. Los regímenes de Portales y Rosas frente al mundo popular, 1829–1852, Santiago, LOM Ediciones, 2014 (coauthored with Daniel Palma, Karen Donoso and Roberto Pizarro).
- Historia Contemporánea de Chile (coauthored with Gabriel Salazar) (1999)
- Caudillos y Plebeyos. La construcción social del Estado en América del Sur (Argentina, Perú, Chile). 1830-1860. Santiago, LOM Ediciones, 2019; Buenos Aires, Editorial Prometeo,2022.
- Populismo en Chile. De Ibáñez a Ibáñez, 1924-1958; 3 vols., Santiago, LOM Ediciones, 2023 (coauthored with Verónica Valdivia, Teresa Gatica, Karen Donoso and Sebastián Leiva).
