= Altos Hornos y Acerías de Corral =

Defunct Chilean company

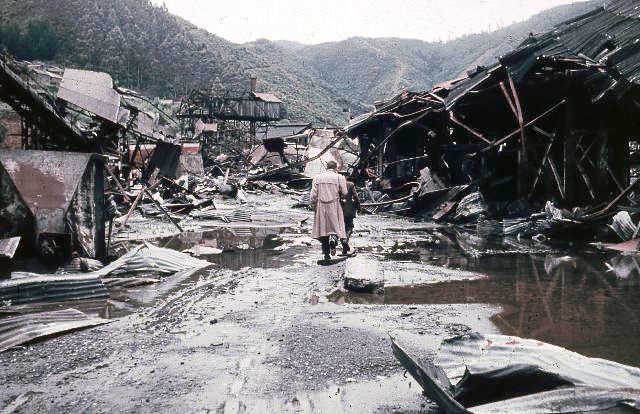
Infrastructure of Altos Hornos y Acerías de Corral after the 1960 Valdivia earthquake.

The Altos Hornos y Acerías de Corral was a major iron and steel industry located at the port of Corral in Chile.

The industry operated using charcoal. The remains of the industry were bought up in 1926 by Valdivian entrepreneurs who established Compañía Electro-Siderúrgica e Industrial de Valdivia, an enterprise considered the inheritor of Altos Hornos y Acerías de Corral.
