= Jorge Pinto Rodríguez =

Chilean historian

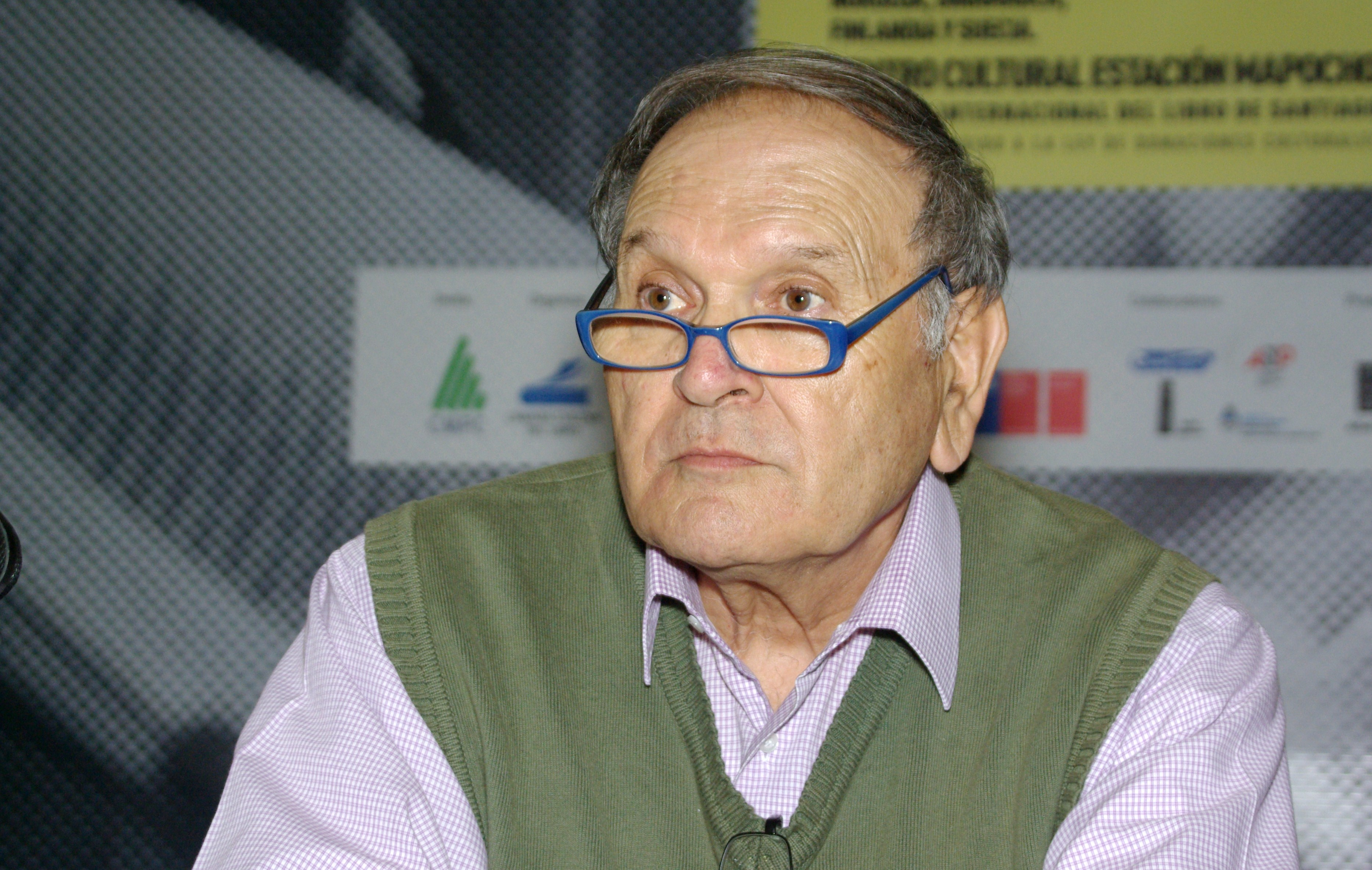
- Born: 18 December 1944; La Serena, Chile
- Occupation: Historian

Jorge Manuel Pinto Rodríguez, (La Serena 18 December 1944) is a Chilean historian. He is known in Chile for his study of the history of Araucanía, social history and demography. In 2012 he gained the Chilean National History Award.
