= Gabriel Salazar =

Chilean historian (born 1936)

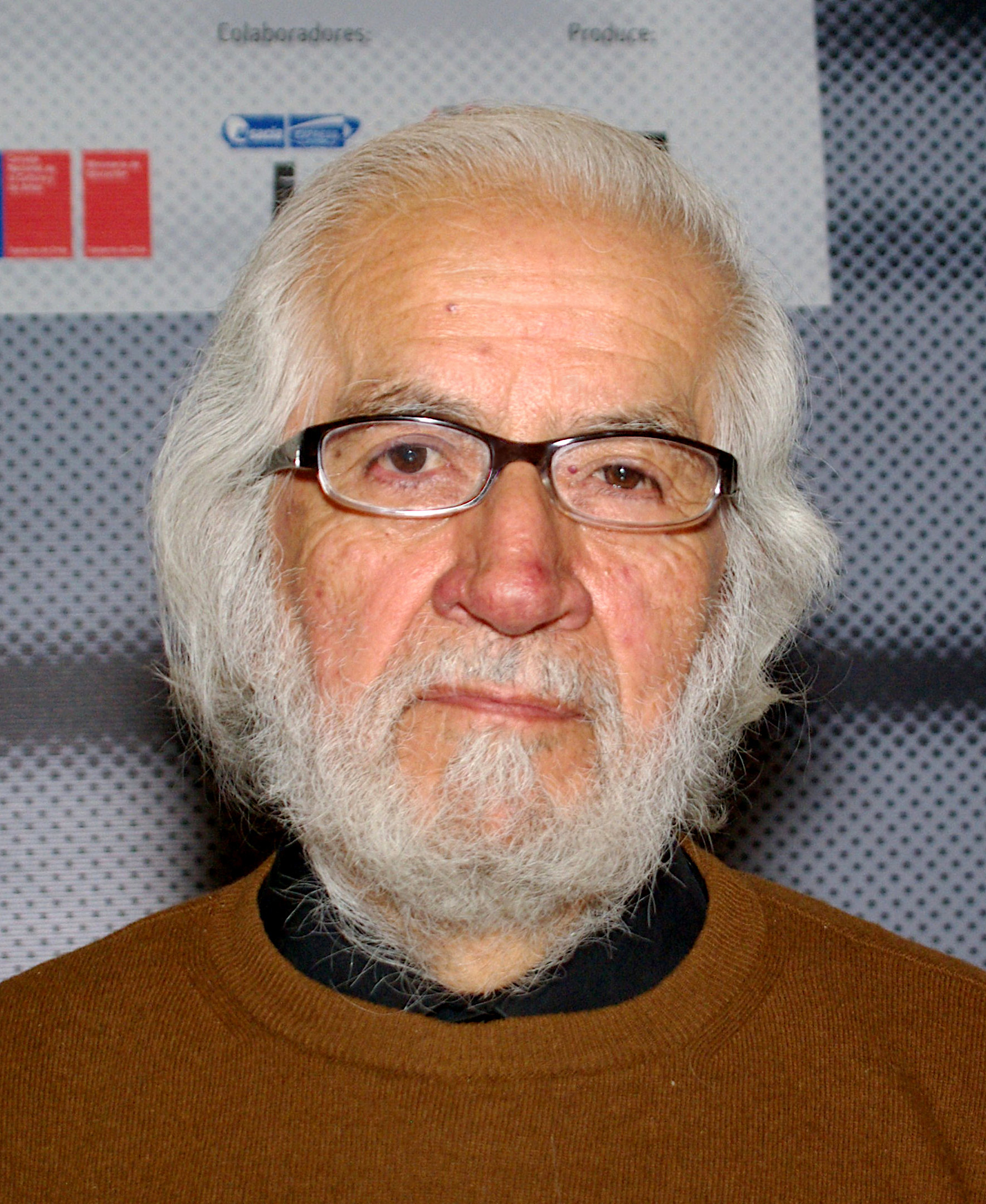
- Salazar in 2015
- Born: 31 January 1936 (age 90); Santiago, Chile
- Education: Universidad de Chile (B.A. in History, 1960); Universidad de Chile (B.A. in Philosophy, 1963); Universidad de Chile (B.A. in Sociology, 1969); University of Hull (PhD in Economic history, 1984)
- Awards: Santiago Municipal Literature Award (2000); Chilean National History Award (2006); Santiago Municipal Literature Award (2016)
- Scientific career
- Fields: History of Chile, social history

Gabriel Salazar Vergara (born 31 January 1936) is a far-left Chilean historian. He is known in his country for his study of social history and interpretations of social movements, particularly the recent student protests of 2006 and 2011–12.

Salazar was born into a lower class family, he studied history, sociology and philosophy at Universidad de Chile, and for time he was assistant of historian Mario Góngora and classical historian Héctor Herrera Cajas. Salazar used to be a member of the Revolutionary Left Movement until 1973. During that year, he was tortured in Villa Grimaldi by the military. Once released from military prison camp in 1976, he went into exile in the United Kingdom. There he obtained a scholarship for continued studies at the University of Hull. He obtained a PhD in Economic and Social History from the university in 1984. The next year he returned to Chile. Relatively unknown, Salazar's breakthrough came in 1985.

His subject of study has included peons, labourers, proletarians, child huachos (Note: In Chilean Spanish a "huacho" is person who is raised without one of the parents, usually without the a father.) and women. Salazar is one of the founders of the historiographic current known as Nueva Historia Social. Salazar considers history as a useful tool for social action. In past interviews, he has declared himself a "leftist, critical social historian" and rejected the label "Marxist".

== Biography ==
Salazar was born into a lower class religious Catholic family. His family lived in the Santiago shanty-town (población) Manuel Montt.

From 1964 to 1968, he worked at the Pontifical Catholic University of Valparaíso History Institute alongside Héctor Herrera Cajas. There, he taught the signature theory of history.

== Particular views ==
Salazar describes the 2011-2012 Chilean student conflict as being the continuation of a long strife between popular citizen movements and civic and military dictatorships. In October 2011, Salazar led a campaign aiming to hold a citizen's plebiscite on the demands behind the 2011-2012 Chilean student protests.

Salazar has been critical of various historical figures like José Miguel Carrera and Diego Portales. (Note: Salazar is one of various historians with a negative assessment of Portales including Benjamín Vicuña Mackenna and Sergio Villalobos.) In addition Salazar has sparkled controversy with his criticism of contemporary student leader Camila Vallejo. (Note: In June 2012 Salazar stated that student leader Camila Vallejo should quit the Communist Party of Chile "if she was intelligent enough".)

== Bibliography ==
- Labradores, Peones y Proletarios (1985)
- Violencia Política Popular en las Grandes Alamedas (1990)
- Los Intelectuales, los Pobres y el Poder (1995)
- Autonomía, Espacio y Gestión (1998)
- Manifiesto de Historiadores (compilador) (1999)
- Historia Contemporánea de Chile (Junto con Julio Pinto – five volumes) (1999–2002)
- Ferias libres: espacio residual de soberanía popular (2002)
- Historia de la acumulación capitalista en Chile (2003)
- La Construcción del Estado en Chile (1800–1830) (2006)
- Ser niño "huacho" en la historia de Chile (2007)
- Mercaderes, empresarios y capitalistas (2009)
- Conversaciones con Carlos Altamirano (2010)
- En el nombre del poder popular constituyente (Chile siglo XXI) (2011)
- La enervante levedad histórica de la clase política civil (Chile, 1900–1973) (2015)
- La historia desde abajo y desde adentro (2017)
- El ejército de Chile y la soberanía popular (2019)
