= Sergio Villalobos =

Chilean historian

Sergio Villalobos Rivera (born April 19, 1930) is a Chilean historian, and Chilean National History Award in 1992. Among his most significant works is the Historia del pueblo Chileno (History of the Chilean people).
