= 2000s commodities boom =

Rise in commodity prices in the early 2000s

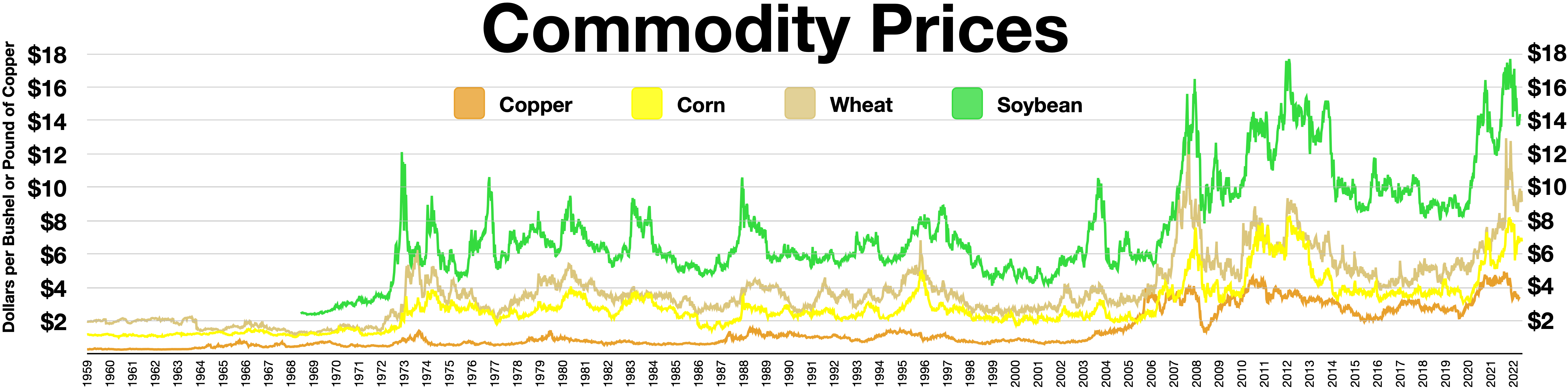
Commodity prices soybean wheat corn copper

The 2000s commodities boom, commodities super cycle or China boom was the rise of many physical commodity prices (such as those of food, oil, metals, chemicals and fuels) during the early 21st century (2000–2014), following the Great Commodities Depression of the 1980s and 1990s. The boom was largely due to the rising demand from emerging markets, particularly China, from 1992 to 2013, as well as the result of concerns over long-term supply availability. There was a sharp downturn in prices during 2008 and early 2009 due to the 2008 financial crisis and European debt crisis, but prices began to rise as demand recovered from late 2009 to mid-2010.

Oil prices began to slip downwards after mid-2010, but rebounded as the Arab Spring disrupted supply lines; thus, the price of oil kept rising into the 2010s. The commodities supercycle peaked in 2011, (Note: Mark Pervan, global head of commodity strategy at Australia & New Zealand Banking Group, said commodity prices peaked in the current cycle in early 2011." "International prices of five energy and metal commodities peaked between February and May of 2011. Since their respective peaks, the Brent crude oil benchmark has fallen 15 per cent, coal 42 per cent, copper 33 per cent, aluminium 37 per cent and iron ore 36 per cent.") "driven by a combination of strong demand from emerging nations and low supply growth". (Note: Eugen Weinberg, head of commodity research at Commerzbank in Germany claimed the commodities super-cycle which began c. 2002, is not coming to an end but just 'taking a break.') Prior to 2002, only 5 to 10 per cent of trading in the commodities market was attributable to investors. Since 2002 "30 per cent of trading is attributable to investors in the commodities market" which "has caused higher price volatility". (Note: This article covers physical product (food, metals, energy) markets but not the ways that services, including those of governments, nor investment, nor debt, can be seen as a commodity. Articles on reinsurance markets, stock markets, bond markets, and currency markets cover those concerns separately and in more depth.)

The 2000s commodities boom is comparable to the commodity supercycles which accompanied post–World War II economic expansion and the Second Industrial Revolution in the second half of the 19th century and early 20th century.

== Background of depressed prices ==
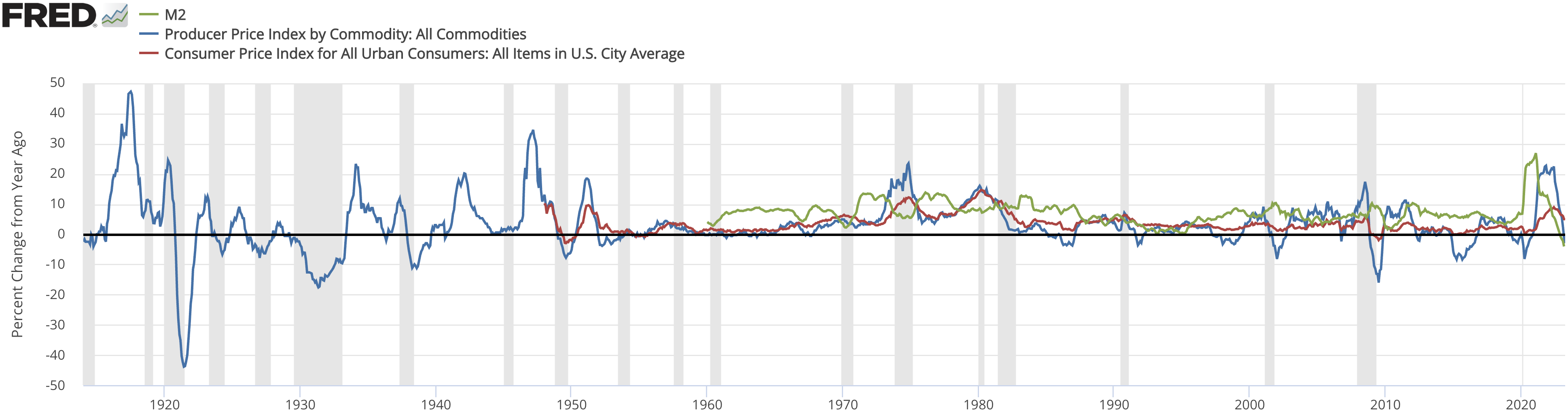
PPI commodities M2 money supply % change year over year Producer price index for commodities United States Consumer Price Index

The prices of raw materials were depressed and declining from, roughly, 1982 until 1998. From the mid-1980s to September 2003, the inflation-adjusted price of a barrel of crude oil on NYMEX was generally under $25/barrel. Since 1968 the price of gold has ranged widely, from a high of $850/oz ($27,300/kg) on 21 January 1980, to a low of $252.90/oz ($8,131/kg) on 21 June 1999 (London Gold Fixing).

The analysis of this period is based on the work of Robert Solow and is rooted in macroeconomic theories of trade including the Mundell–Fleming model. One opinion stated that

"The volatility and interest rates found its way into commodity inputs and all sectors of the world economy."

Hence, in the case of an economic crisis commodities prices follow the trends in exchange rate (coupled) and its prices decrease in case there are downward trends of diminishing money supply.

Foreign exchange impacts commodities prices and so does money supply: the advent of a crisis will pull commodities prices down.

== Boom ==
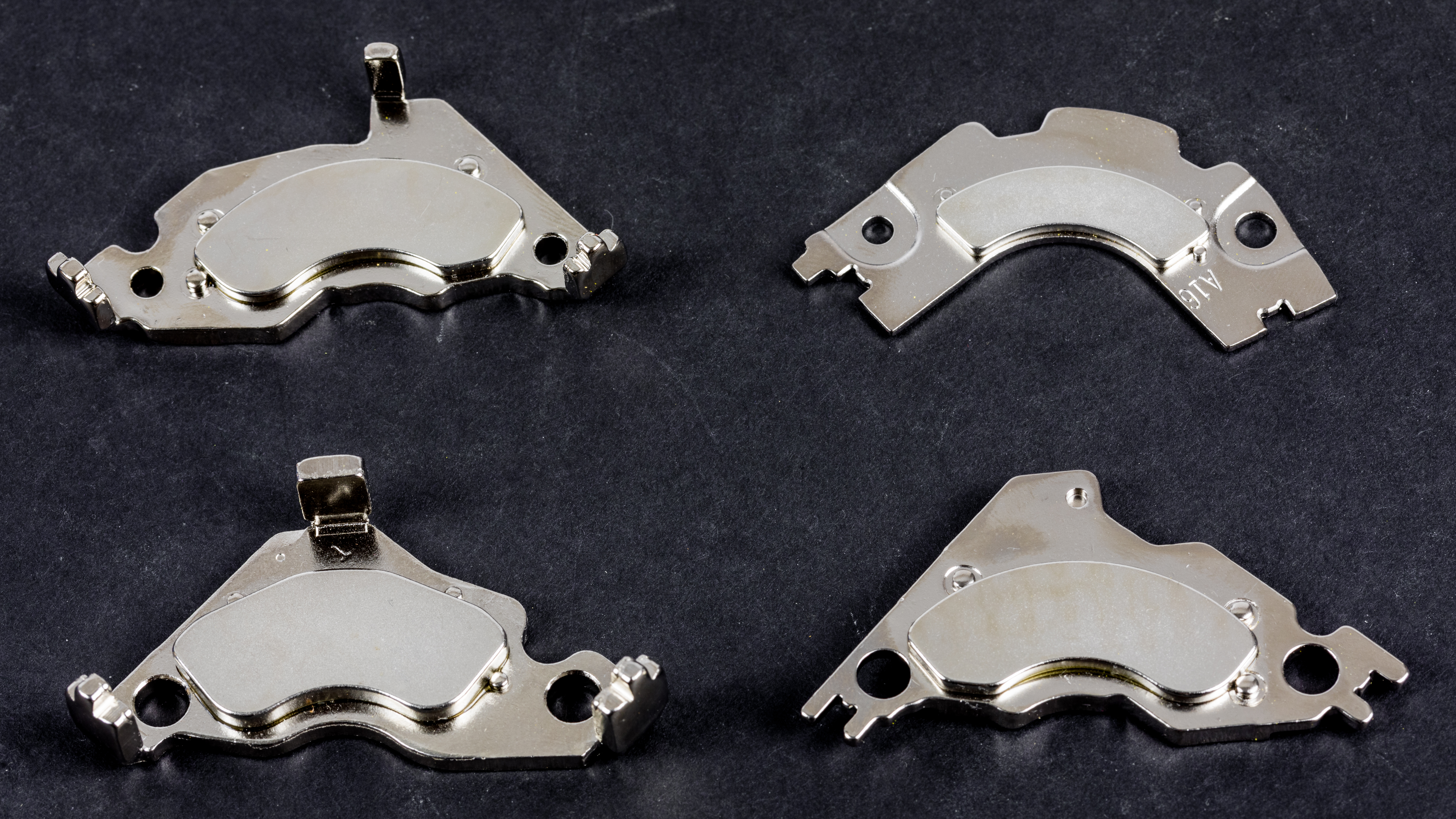
A Neodymium magnet on a bracket from a hard drive.

A commodity price bubble, known as the 2000s commodities boom, was created following the collapse of the mid-2000s housing bubble.

Commodities, supported by China’s rapid urbanisation drive and rising affluence, were viewed as a relatively secure investment after housing markets in several Western nations bubble economy surrounding housing prices had gone from boom to bust in several western nations, including the USA, UK, Ireland, Greece and Spain. Some advisers claimed that commodity prices could be predicted better than stocks, since they are traded for actual usage and the price is based on supply and demand, while stocks are bought for speculation and news immediately influence prices.

The renewed interest in coal by China's and Taiwan's energy companies and the rise of alternative power sources like wind farms helped modify coal prices over the 2000s.

Chlorine price steadily increased throughout 2007 and early 2008 as demand for PVC and some metals like copper, neodymium and tantalum rose due to the increased growth of the BRIC countries' demand for electrical goods. Russia increased production, but the US offset this with production cuts in the late 1990s and mid-2000s.

Phosphorus, rhodium, molybdenum, manganese, vanadium and palladium are used in high grade steels, oil based lubricants, automotive catalytic converters, chemical plants' catalysts, electronics, TV screens and in radio isotopes. Demand for these metals appeared to be increasing as computers and mobile phones became more popular in the mid to late 2000s. Thulium is used in x-ray tubes and neodymium is used in high strength/high grade magnets.

Molybdenum, rhodium, neodymium and palladium are relatively scarce metals, while manganese and vanadium are, like phosphorus and sulfur, fairly abundant for minor minerals. The major metals such as iron, lead and tin are commonplace.

Recycling of the aluminum, ferrous metals, copper fractions, gold, palladium and platinum in mobile phones and computers had got under way by the mid-2000s. Battery recycling has helped bring down both the nickel and cadmium prices.

Sulfuric acid (an important chemical commodity used in processes such as steel processing, copper production and bioethanol production) increased in price 3.5-fold in less than 1 year while producers of sodium hydroxide have declared force majeure due to flooding, precipitating similarly steep price increases.

=== Food ===
==== Corn, wheat, rice, cocoa and Soya beans ====
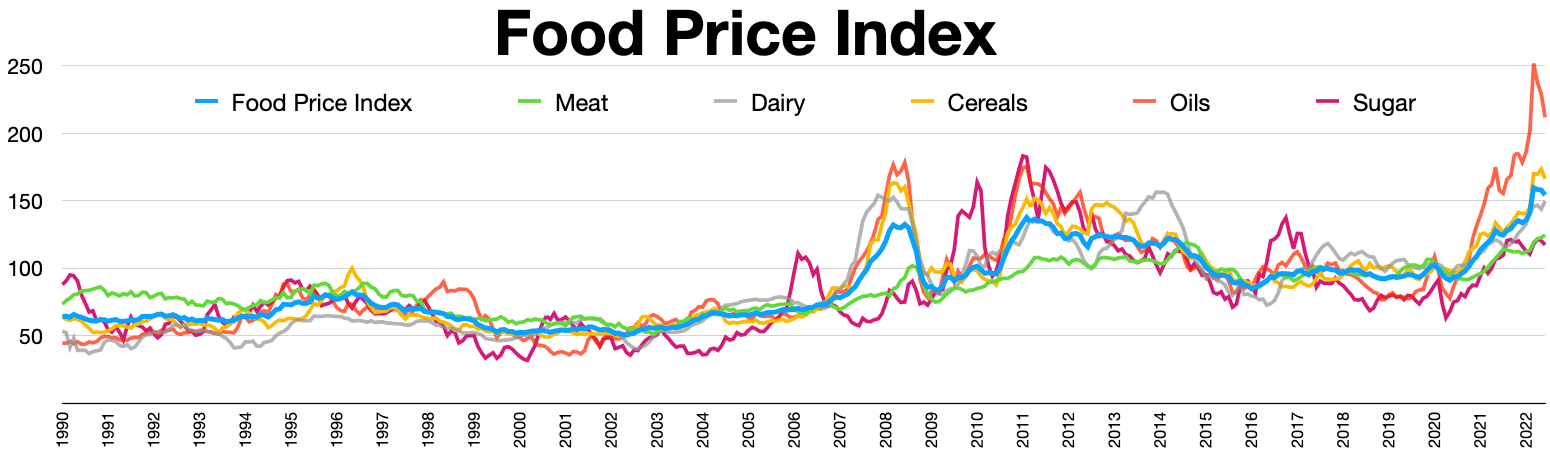
Food Price Index Oils Cereals Dairy Meat sugar

The growth in food production has been greater than population growth.

Both a rising global population and a sharp decline in food crop production in favour of a sharp rise in biofuel crops helped cause a sharp rise in basic food stock prices. Ethiopia also saw a drought threaten its already frail farm lands in 2007. Cocoa was also affected by a bad crop in 2008, due to disease and unusually heavy rain in parts of West Africa.

Rising demand in both India and Egypt helped to ramp up demand for American wheat during the bull market during August 2007. Discounted wheat sold at about £11–£15/t. August 2007, with non-discounted wheat at slightly higher price. The November 2007 wheat futures market was trading at nearly £165/t, with November 2008 contracts at £128.50. The market became rather bearish as non-futures prices froze and stagnated in December 2007. The price of wheat reached record highs after Kazakhstan began to limit supplies being sold overseas in early 2008, but had slowed down by late 2008. Food riots hit Egypt on 12 April 2008, as national bread prices rose rapidly in March and April 2008.

In late April 2008, rice prices hit 24 cents (U.S.) per U.S. pound, more than doubling the price in just seven months. The price of wheat had risen from an already high £88 per tonne to £91 from January to March 2010, due to the bullish market and currency concerns. This led to food riots in places such as Haiti, Indonesia, Côte d'Ivoire, Uzbekistan, Egypt and Ethiopia.

On 31 July, leading economists predicted that food prices, especially wheat would rise in Chad as Russia ended exports due to a domestic drought destroying their wheat and barley harvests. By 3 August, wheat prices stood at $7.11 per bushel due to the Russian export ban.

==== Fertilizer ====
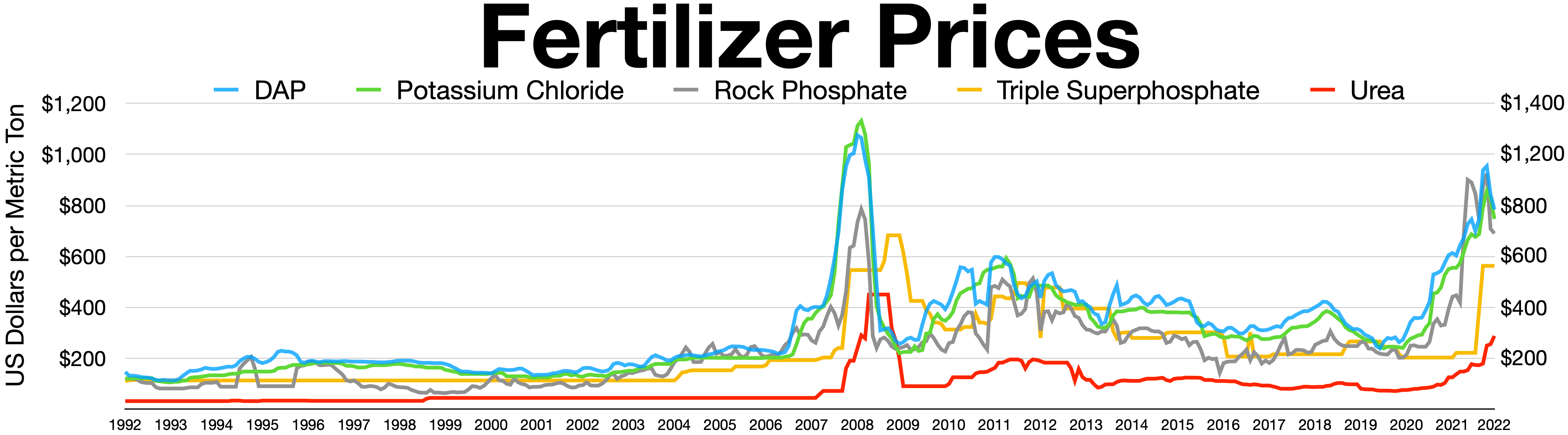
Fertilizer prices DAP Potassium chloride Phosphorite Triple Superphosphate Urea

There was in increase in the demand for fertilizer from China and India. Also an increase in demand for fertilizer to create biofuels like Ethanol as a Fuel from corn in the United States, Brazil, and Europe. Increased livestock grew demand for more grain and fertilizer causing grain reserves to plunge to a historic low. China put export controls on their fertilizer. Natural gas prices increased a lot during this period and that is used in the process of making some fertilizers (Haber process). Phosphate prices went up because of an increase in price of sulfur which is an input to phosphate fertilizer.

Production and price (US market) of elemental sulfur

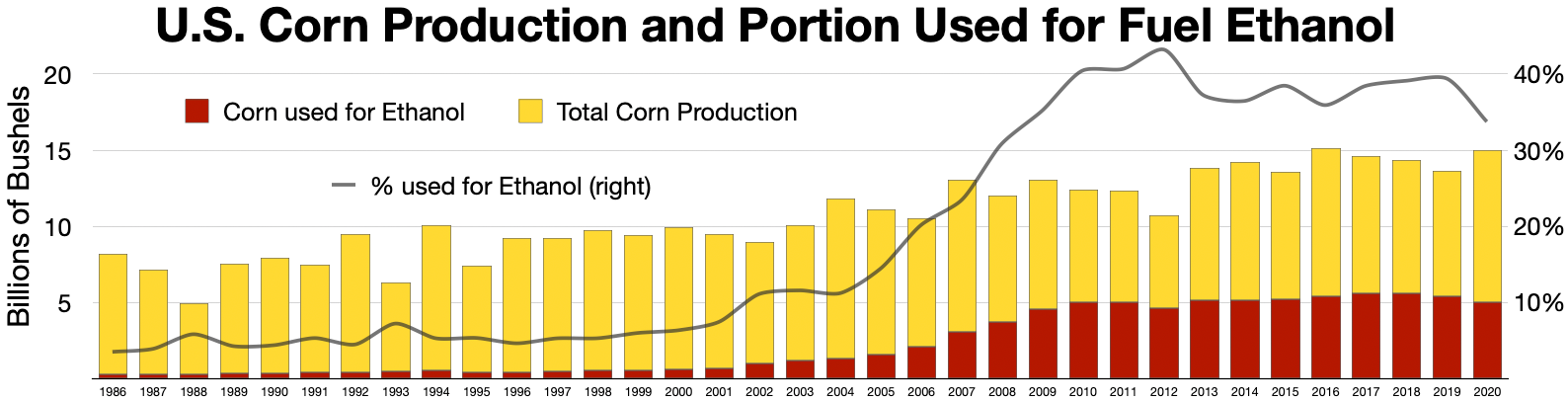
Corn vs Ethanol production in the United States Total corn production (bushels) (left) Corn used for Ethanol fuel (bushels) (left) Percent of corn used for Ethanol (right)

==== Sugar ====
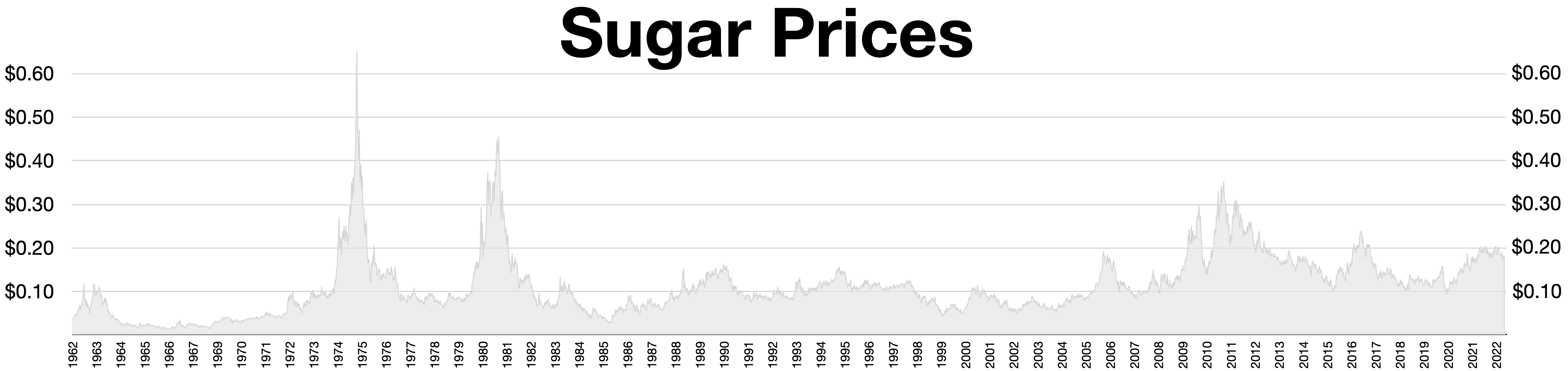
Sugar Prices 1962-2022

Prices rose modestly and briefly because of Hurricane Katrina in 2005 and 2006 but a bigger price climb came later from supply disruptions in India, Brazil, and other places around the world.

=== Paper ===
==== Recycled paper ====
The price of recycled paper has varied greatly over the last 30 or so years. The German price of €100/£49 per tonne was typical for the year 2003 and it steadily rose over the years. By September 2008 saw American price of $235 per ton had fallen to just $120 per ton, The slump was probably due to the economic down turn in East Asia causing the market for waste paper drying up in China. 2010 prices averaged $120.32 at the start of the year, but saw a rapid rise in global prices in May 2010, reaching $217.11 per ton in the US in June 2010 as China's paper market began to reopen.

=== Fuel ===
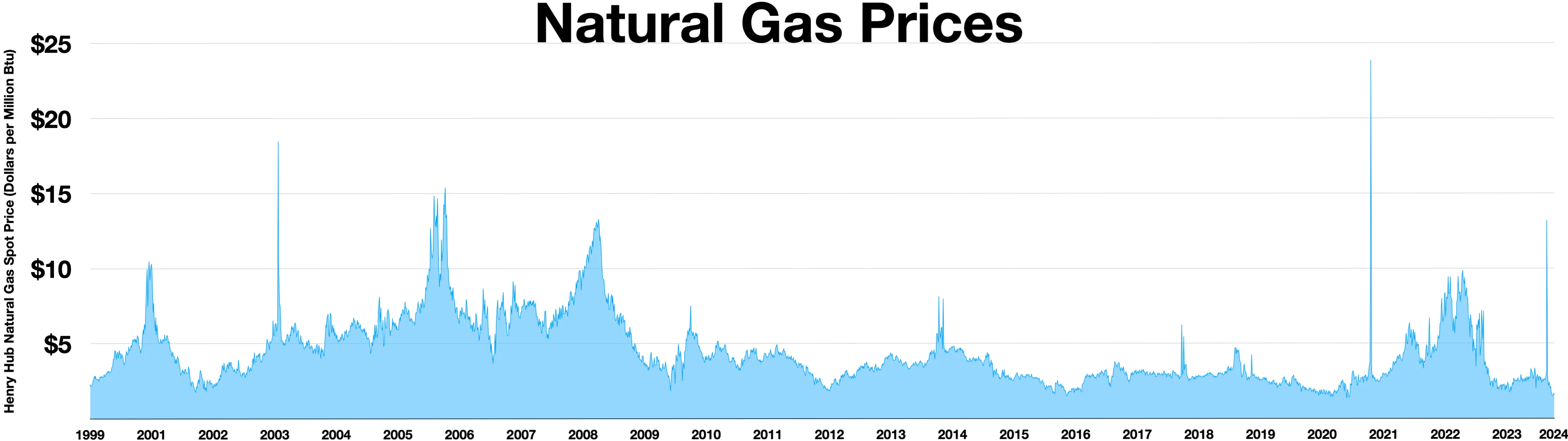
Natural gas prices Henry Hub

==== Coal ====
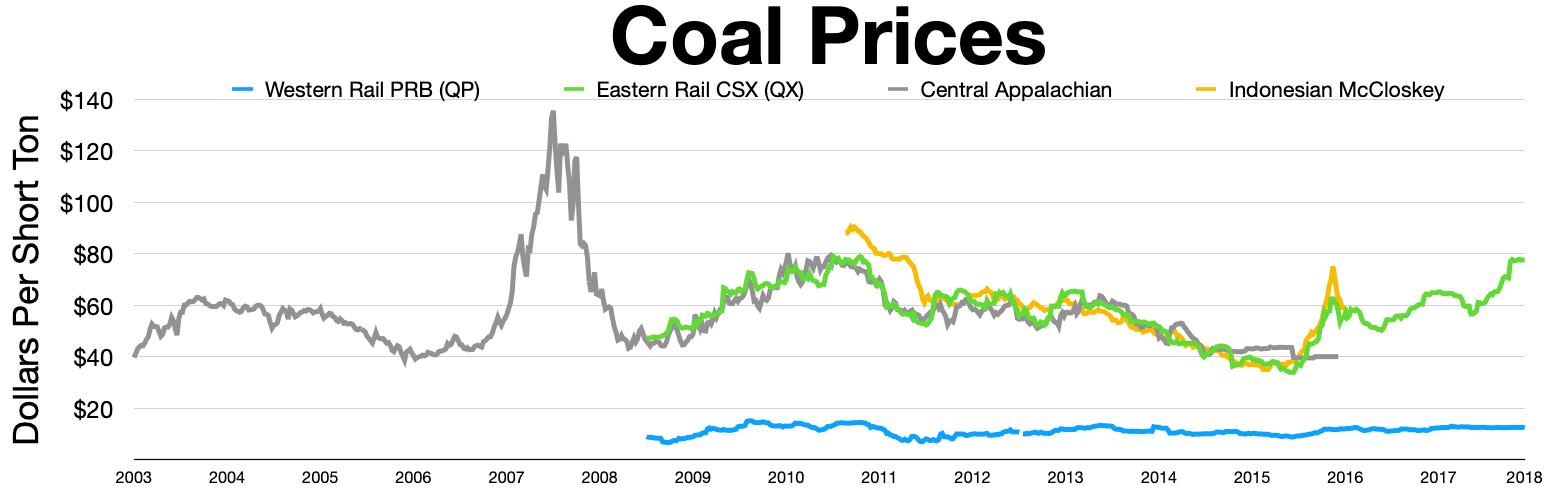
Coal prices

Coal prices rose to A$73 per tonne in September and then up to A$84 per tonne in the October 2009 due to renewed interest by China's and Taiwan's energy companies.

==== Oil ====
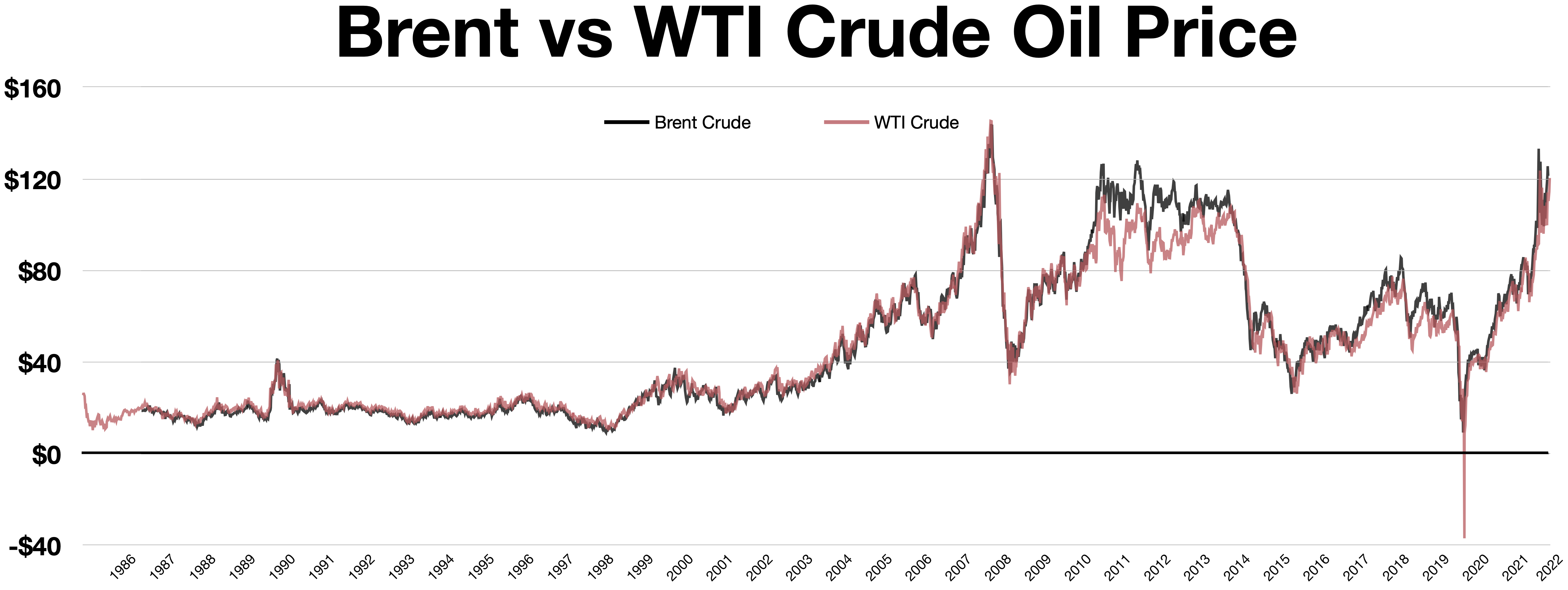
Brent Crude West Texas Intermediate

During 2003, the price rose above $30, reached $60 by 11 August 2005, and peaked at $147.30 in July 2008. Commentators attributed the heavy price increases to many factors, including reports from the United States Department of Energy and others showing a decline in petroleum reserves, worries over peak oil, Middle East tension, and oil price speculation.

For a time, geo-political events and natural disasters indirectly related to the global oil market had strong short-term effects on oil prices, such as North Korean missile tests, the 2006 conflict between Israel and Lebanon, worries over Iranian nuclear plans in 2006, Hurricane Katrina, and various other factors. By 2008, such pressures appeared to have an insignificant impact on oil prices given the onset of the global recession. The recession caused demand for energy to shrink in late 2008, with oil prices falling from the July 2008 high of $147 to a December 2008 low of $32. Oil prices stabilized by October 2009 and established a trading range between $60 and $80.

The price of oil nearly tripled from $50 to $147 from early 2007 to 2008, before plunging during the 2008 financial crisis. Experts debate the causes, which include the flow of money from housing and other investments into commodities to speculation and monetary policy or the increasing feeling of raw materials scarcity in a fast-growing world economy and thus positions taken on those markets, such as Chinese increasing presence in Africa. An increase in oil prices tends to divert a larger share of consumer spending into gasoline, which creates downward pressure on economic growth in oil importing countries, as wealth flows to oil-producing states.

In January 2008, oil prices surpassed $100 a barrel for the first time, the first of many price milestones to be passed in the course of the year. In July 2008, oil peaked at $147.30 a barrel and a gallon of gasoline was more than $4 across most of the US. The high of 2008 may have been part of broader pattern of spiking instability in the price of oil over the preceding decade. This pattern of instability in oil price may be a product of peak oil. There is concern that if the economy was to improve, oil prices might return to pre-recession levels.

In testimony before the Senate Committee on Commerce, Science, and Transportation on 3 June 2008, former director of the CFTC Division of Trading & Markets (responsible for enforcement) Michael Greenberger specifically named the Atlanta-based IntercontinentalExchange, founded by Goldman Sachs, Morgan Stanley and BP as playing a key role in the speculative run-up of oil futures prices traded off the regulated futures exchanges in London and New York.

The price of oil rose to $77 per barrel on 24 June 2010 as a cyclone begins to form in the south western Caribbean. The price for July 2010 was about $84–$90 per barrel of crude oil.

Oil prices ended the year at $101.80, falling to $100.01 per barrel on 30 and 31 January 2011., then the Egyptian civil war broke out, as it theoretically put the use of Suez Canal at risk. Making matters worse, a gas pipeline to Jordan was blown up by saboteurs in the Sinai Peninsula. Prices remained steady until a dramatic drop began the 2010s oil glut.

==== Jet fuel ====
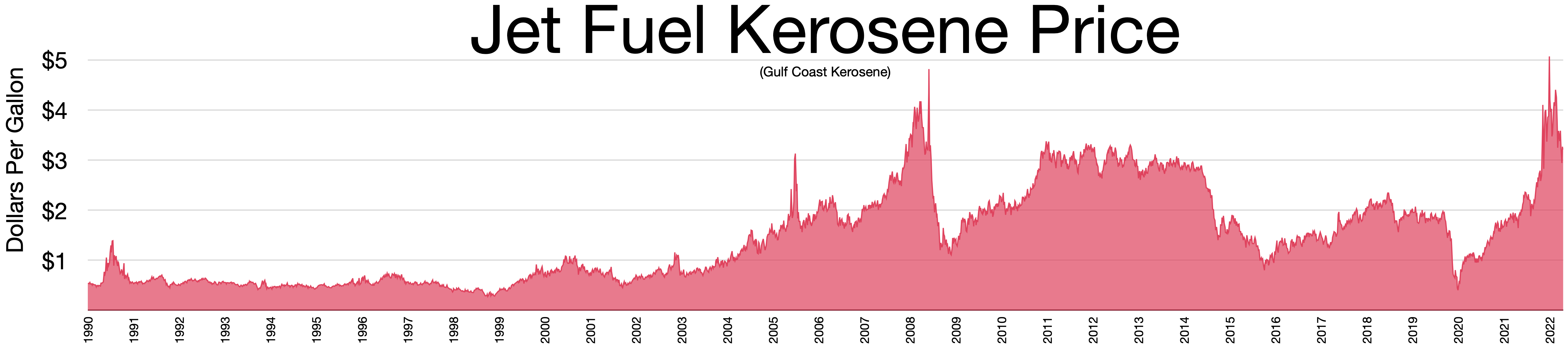
Jet fuel kerosene price

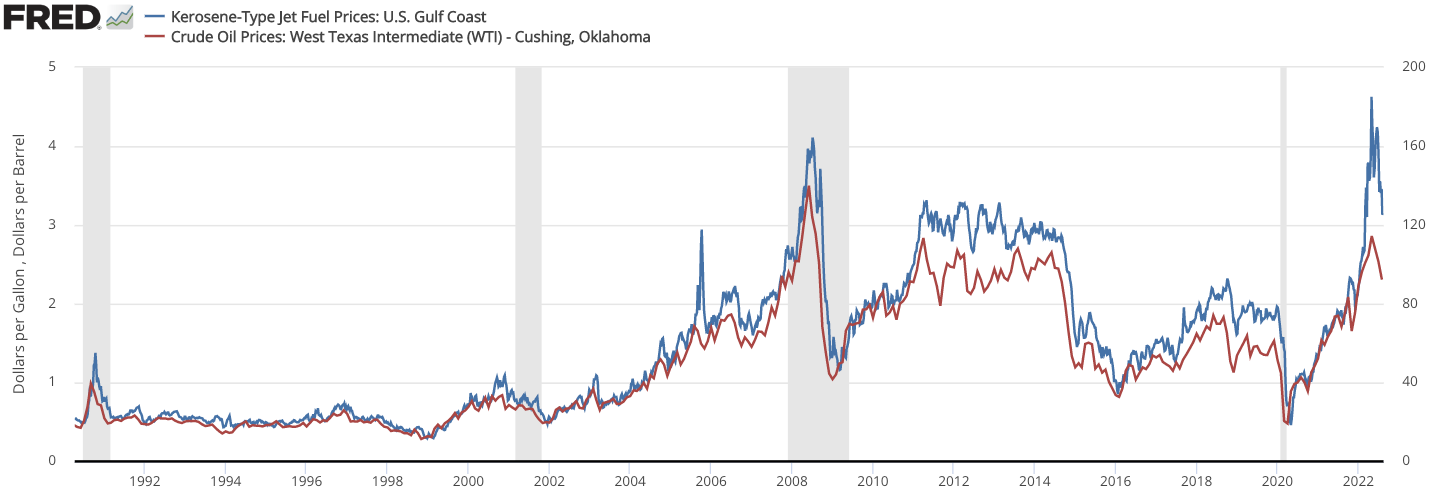
Jet fuel prices per gallon (left) WTI crude oil price per barrel (right)

Hurricane Katrina caused Jet fuel prices to rise in 2005 because of slowed down refining in the Gulf Coast area, those prices dipped and the price of jet fuel went up with the price of oil through 2008.

==== Uranium ====
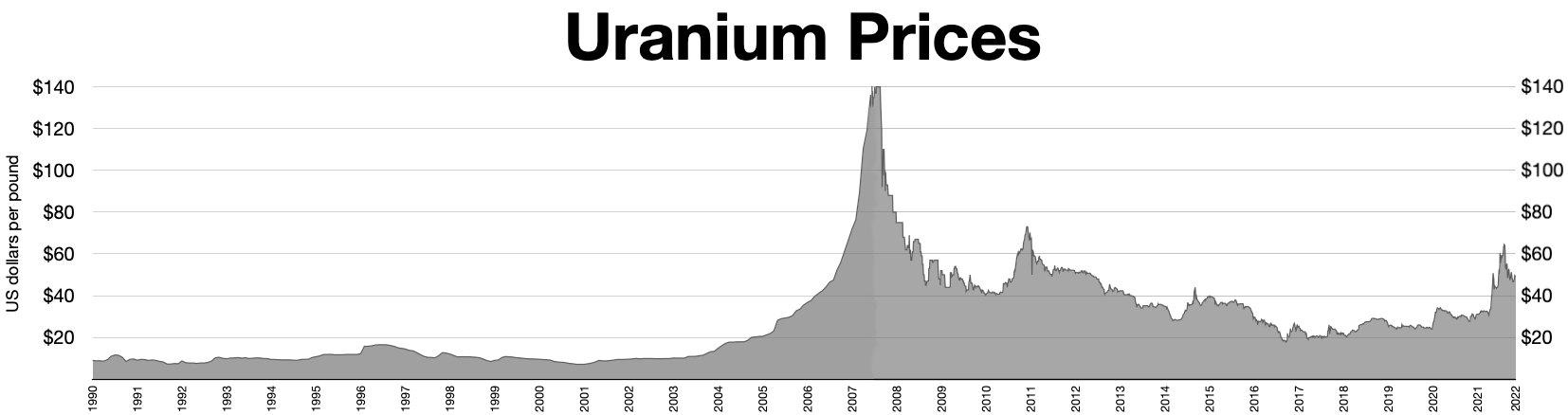
Uranium prices

Uranium traded at about $15–$20/kg since the late 1980s due to a 10-year secular bear market, with a 2001 low of just over $10/kg. The Uranium bubble of 2007 started in 2005 and began to accelerate badly with the 2006 flooding of the Cigar Lake Mine in Saskatchewan. Uranium prices peaked at roughly $300/kg in mid-2007, began to fall in mid-2008 and are now (end 2010) hovering about $100/kg. The stock prices of many uranium mining and exploration companies rose sharply, only to fall later in this boom.

There was also a resurgence of interest in nuclear power by the UK government between 2006 and 2008 due to the apparently insecure nature of Middle Eastern and Russian oil and after the closure of several old and economically/environmentally unviable coal fired power stations at the time. This helped the uranium price to rally at this date.

=== Precious metals ===
==== Gold ====
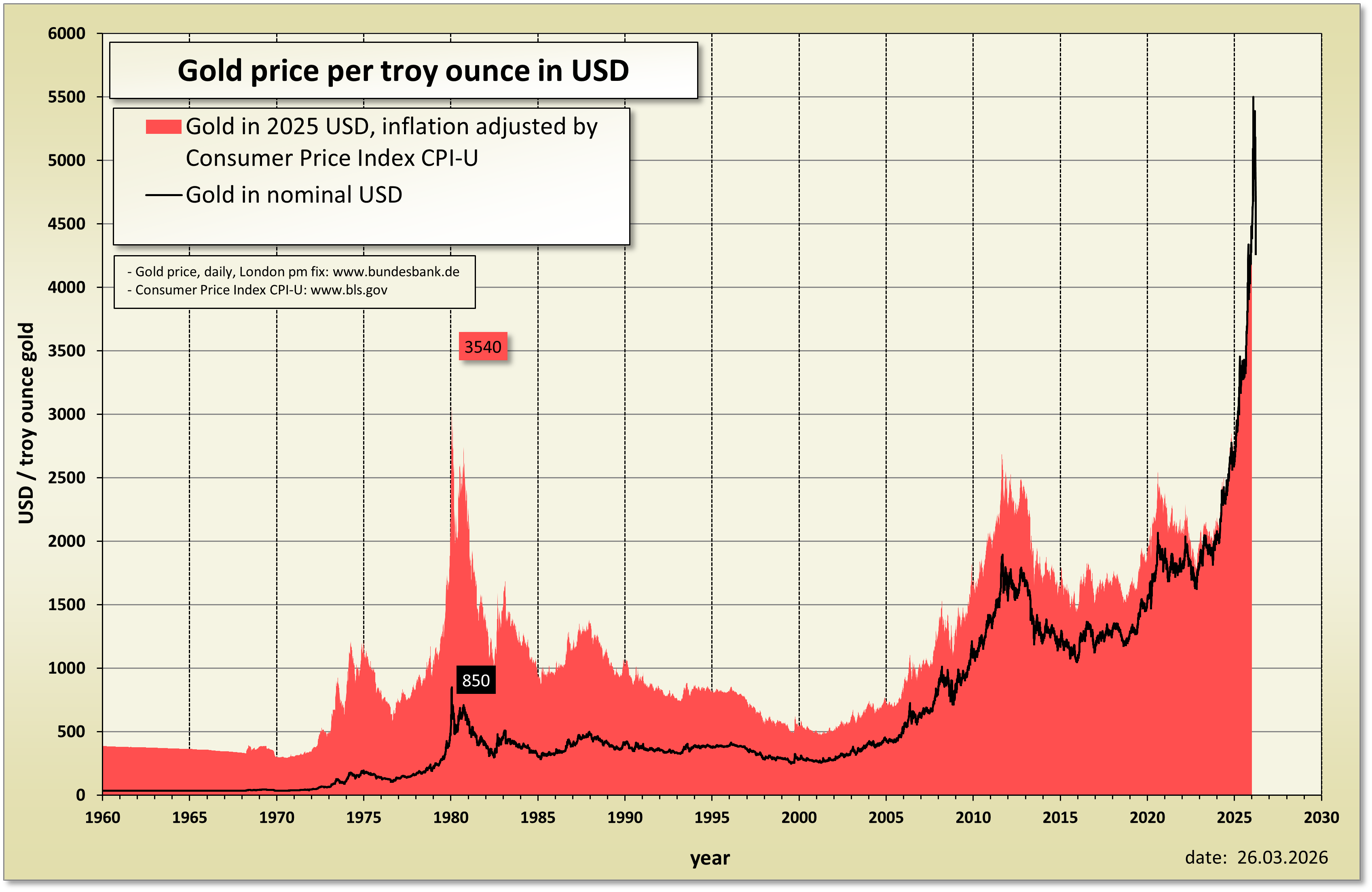
Gold price per troy ounce in USD since 1960, in nominal US$ and inflation adjusted in 2012 US$.

There was a sharp shift in the prices of gold and, to a lesser extent, both silver and platinum. Prices were at or near an all-time high in late 2010 due to people using the precious metals as a safe haven for their money as both the de facto value of cash and the stock market prices became more erratic in the late 2000s.

The period from 1999 to 2001 marked the "Brown Bottom" after a 20-year secular bear market at $252.90 per troy ounce. Prices increased rapidly from 2001, but the 1980 high was not exceeded until 3 January 2008 when a new maximum of $865.35 per troy ounce was set (a.m. London Gold Fixing). Another record price was set on 17 March 2008 at $1,023.50/oz ($32,900/kg) (am. London Gold Fixing). In the fall of 2009, gold markets experience renewed momentum upwards due to increased demand and a weakening US dollar. On 2 December 2009, gold passed the important barrier of US$1,200 per ounce to close at $1,215. Gold further rallied hitting new highs in May 2010 after the European Union debt crisis prompted further purchase of gold as a safe asset.

Since April 2001, the price of gold has more than tripled in value against the US dollar, prompting speculation that the long secular bear market had ended and a bull market has returned. Gold's price finally stood at $1,350 per troy oz on 1 July 2010.

On 7 October 2010, it cost $1,364.60 per troy ounce, by 7 December reached the all time nominal historic high of $1,429.05 per troy ounce.

==== Silver ====
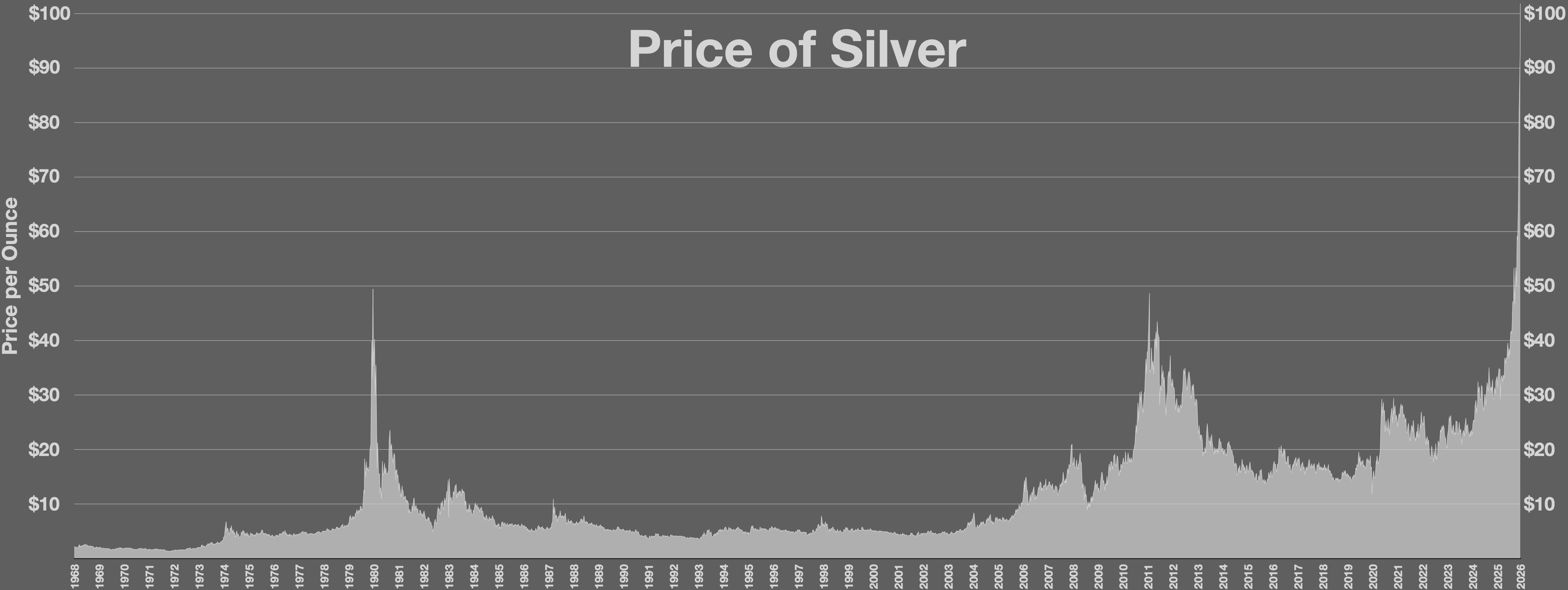
Price of silver

Silver cost $4 per troy ounce in 1992, started to rise rapidly in early 2004, reached $18 per troy oz by late 2007, slipped badly to $10 per troy oz during the Credit Crunch of 2008, but was selling in late 2009 and again in early 2010 at just under $18 per troy oz of metal. A year later, the Feb 2011 average was over $30 per oz of silver. On 29 April 2011, silver price reached $47.94 but fell by 12% on 2 May 2011. Prices range around $20–$25 in 2013-2014.

==== Platinum ====
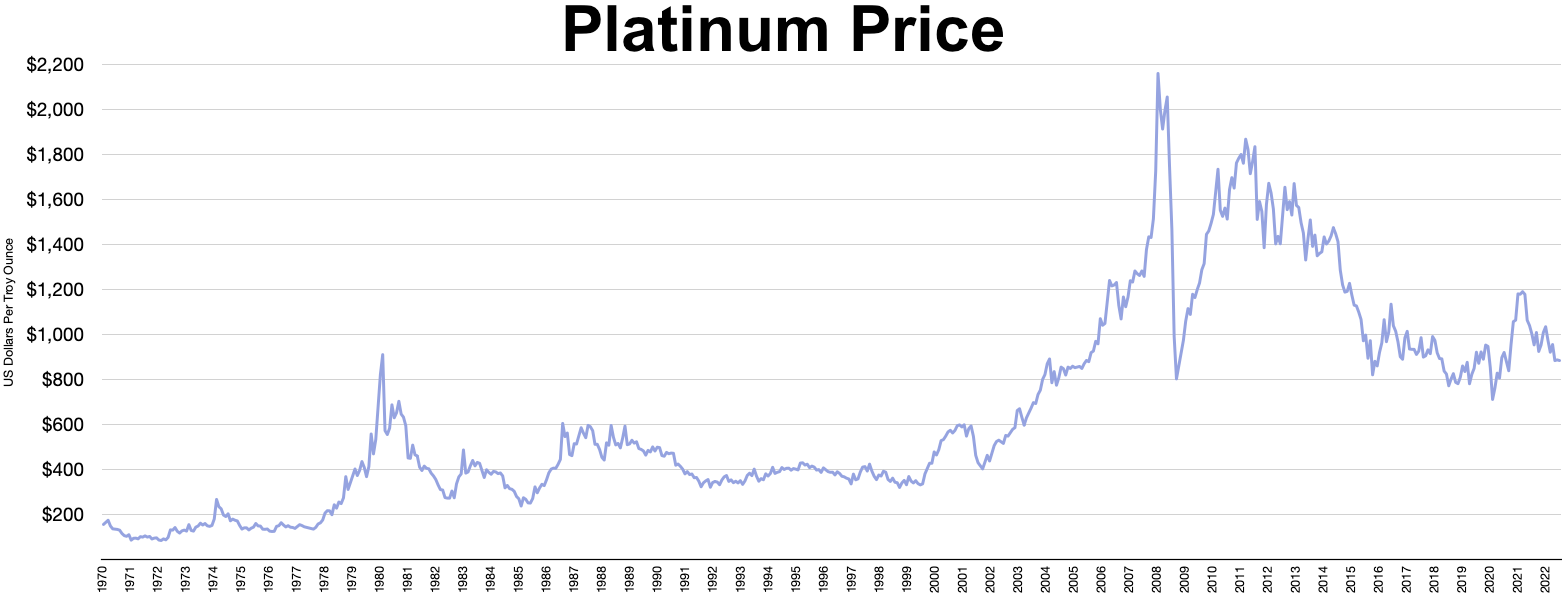
Platinum price 1970-2022

Platinum first sold at about $350 per troy oz in 1992 and stayed rather flat save for a small dip to about $325 per troy oz in the mid-1990s and an equally small rise to about $375 per troy ounce in the Millennium period. It started to gain value in mid-2002 and grew on an experiential curve model as the prices then began to move sharply upwards. The high point was when it was trading for $2,200 per troy oz in early 2007. Prices declined to $800 per troy oz in January 2008, but the price had increased $1,600 per troy oz by early 2010.

==== Titanium ====
Titanium prices rose to over $16,000 per metric ton in 2006.

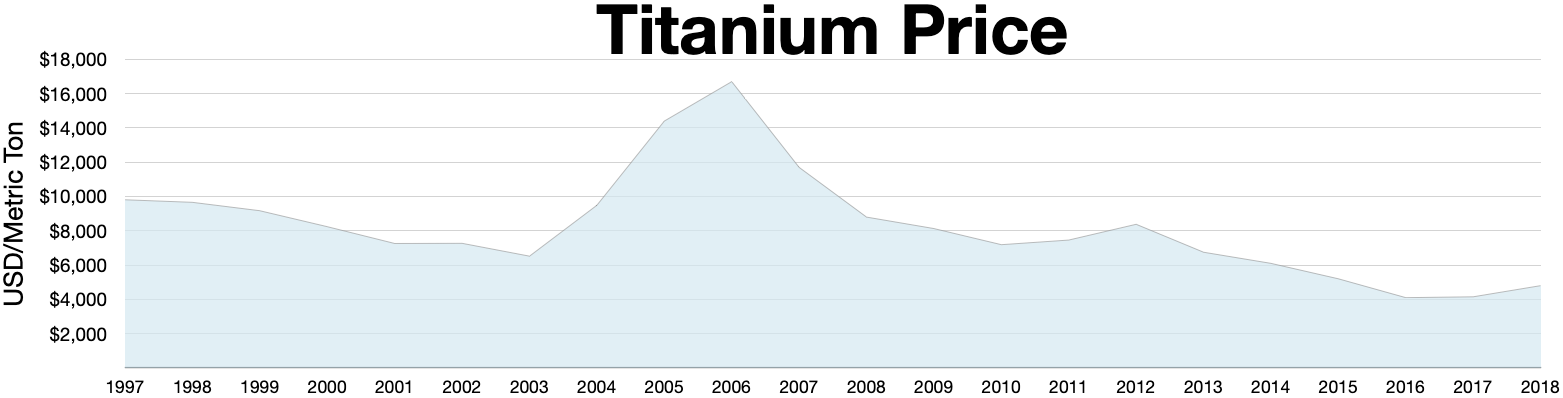
Titanium price 1997-2018

==== Rhodium ====
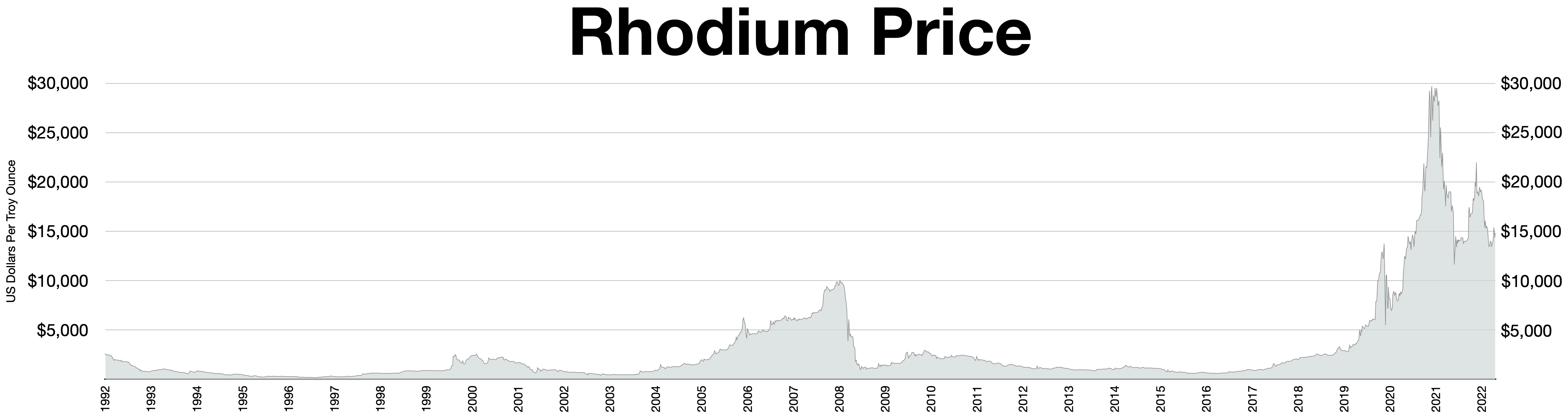
Rhodium daily Price 1992-2022

Rhodium prices rose briefly during the millennium period due to increased demand, then collapsed to nearly their original 1995-7 starting price of $500/oz between 2002 and 2004.

Later on, the mysterious and unexpected Rhodium price bubble of 2008 suddenly increased prices from just over $500/oz in late 2006 to $9,000/oz-$9,500/oz in July 2008, only for the price then to tumble down only $1,000/oz in January 2009. Both an increase in demand in the American automotive industry, a herd instinct among investors, a then bullish market in rare metals and a rogue speculator or rogue speculators on Wall Street were all at least partly to blame for the sudden rise and fall in the rare metal's price.

Rhodium is mainly mined as a by-product of other metals such as platinum, so the production is based on production of other metals and therefore on demand of them, and less on the demand of rhodium.

Rhodium rose in price extremely sharply in January 2021 and by mid February 2021 it had reached an all time high of $21,400 per Troy ounce making it the most valuable metal ever sold.

==== Palladium ====
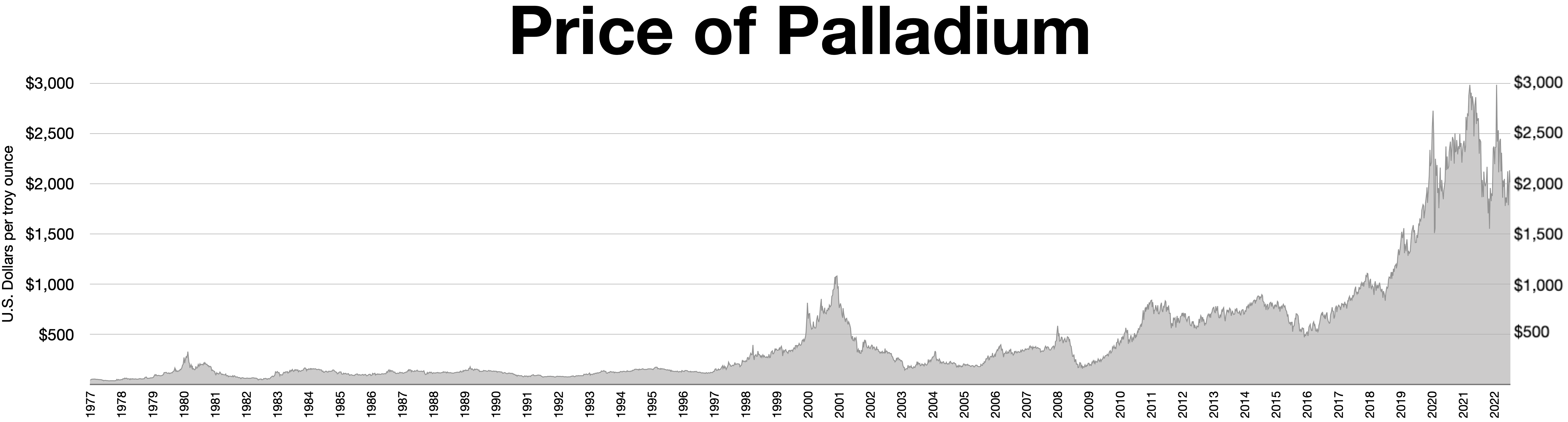
Palladium prices – US Dollars per troy ounce

Most palladium is used for catalytic converters in the automobile industry. It is also used for some medical, high grade steel, industrial, dental and electronic purposes.

Palladium prices rose sharply during the millennium period due to increased demand, then collapsed to nearly their original starting price by the end 2002, only to start to rise less dramatically in the year 2006. Palladium prices in 1992 and 2002–04 was about $200/oz. It rapidly shot up to approximately $1,000/oz between 1999 and 2001 and collapsed to only $200/oz by late 2002, but is now just under $500/oz per of Palladium in 2010.

In the run up to 2000, Russian supply of palladium to the global market was repeatedly delayed and disrupted because the export quota was not granted on time, for political reasons. The ensuing market panic drove the palladium price to an all-time high of $1,100 per troy ounce in January 2001. Around this time, the Ford Motor Company, fearing auto vehicle production disruption due to a possible palladium shortage, stockpiled large amounts of the metal purchased near the price high. When prices fell in early 2001, Ford lost nearly US$1 billion. World demand for palladium increased from 100 tons in 1990 to nearly 300 tons in 2000. The global production of palladium from mines was 222 tonnes in 2006 according to the USGS.

==== Rhenium ====
Because of the low availability relative to demand, rhenium is among the most expensive industrial metals, with an average price exceeding US$6,000 per kilogram, as of mid-2009. It first traded in 1928 at US$10,000 per kilogram of metal, but traded at US$250 per Troy ounce in mid-2010. It traded in July 2010, at about US$4,000–4,500/kg.

=== Other industrial metals ===
==== Aluminium ====
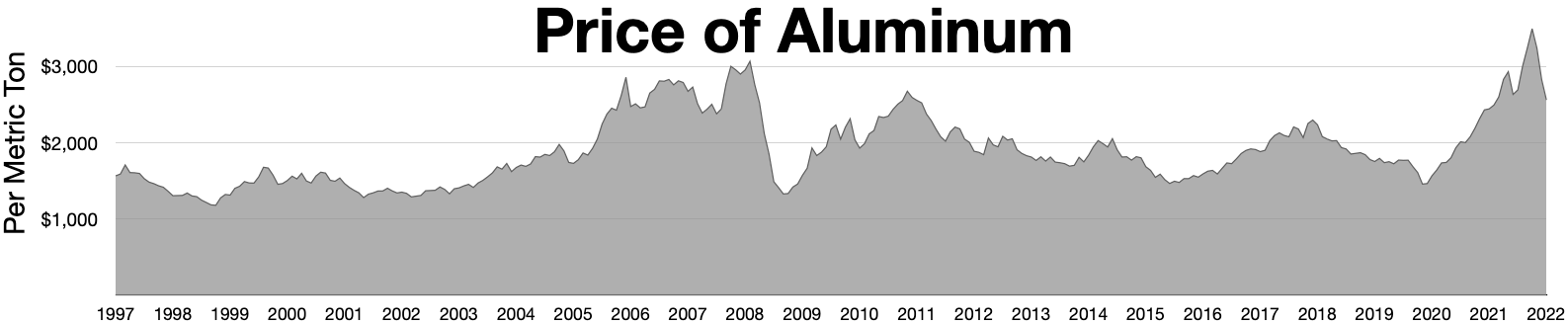
Price of aluminum

Aluminium is a widely used, mined, refined and trusted metal. The fortunes of this metal are linked to the rise and fall of the aircraft, electrical and automotive industries.

The price of aluminium was 80 US cents per lb in 1995 and 45 cents per lb in 1998 and hovered around this until the January 2003, when it started to rise to $1.50 per pound and in 2006 and $1.40 per lb in the December 2007. It collapsed down to a mere 60 cents per lb in the November 2008, but is now hovering at about $1.00 per lb, with a new April peak of $1.10 per pound of aluminium.

==== Nickel ====
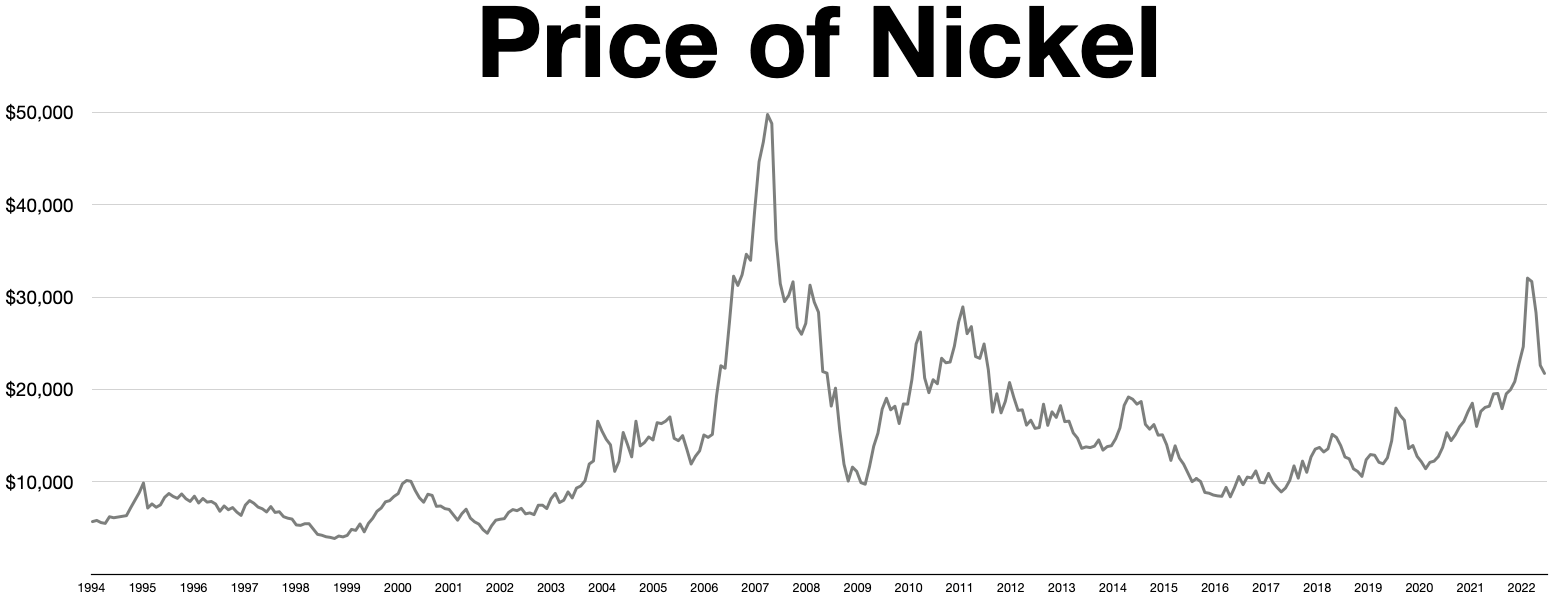
Price of Nickel

The price of nickel boomed in the late 1990s, then imploded from around $51,000 /£36,700 per tonne in May 2007 to about $11,550/£8,300 per tonne in January 2009. Prices were only just starting to recover as of January 2010, but most of Australia's nickel mines had gone bankrupt by then. As the price for high grade nickel sulphate ore recovered in 2010, so did the Australian mining industry. Battery recycling has helped bring down both the nickel and cadmium prices.

==== Copper ====
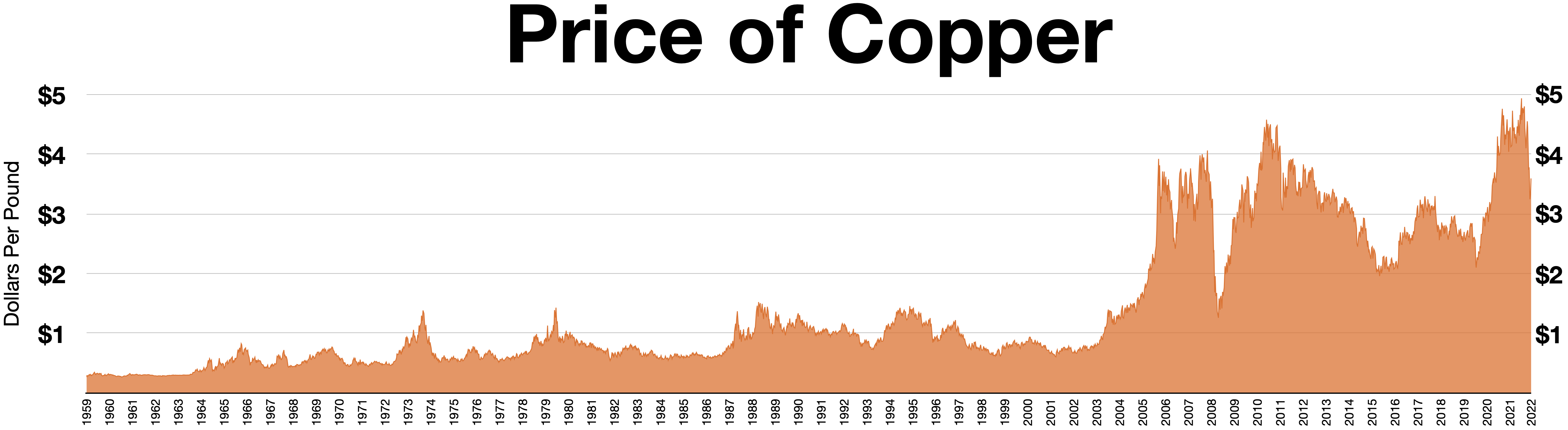
Price of Copper 1959-2022

In the years prior to the rise of copper prices in late 2003 as part of the boom, various copper mining companies exibited cartel-like behaviour. This consisted of announcements made in late 2001 for production cuts for 2002 which were carried out, and a repetition of similar announcements for 2003 in late 2002.

It was also noticed that a copper price bubble was occurring at the same time as the oil bubble. Copper traded at about $2,500 per tonne from 1990 until 1999, when it fell to about $1,600. The price slump lasted until 2004 which saw a price surge that had copper reaching $9,000 per tonne in the May 2006, but it eventually fell down to $7,040 per tonne in early 2008. When the slump came, it hit some copper mining countries like the Democratic Republic of the Congo (D.R.C.) very hard. Mining authorities announced on 10 December 2009, that the Dikulushi mine, which is situated in the D.R.C.'s Katanga Province, would close due to poor copper prices. It reopened in July 2010. The price rose again to over $10,000 in early 2011 but soon fell to below $8,000, around where it was fairly stable during 2012. The high prices have caused a heavy increase in theft of copper cables, causing interruptions in electrical supply. From 2013 to 2014 there was a slow decline to below $7,000. High copper prices during the boom led to a temporary renewed interest in aluminium as substitute for copper.

Chilean state-owned copper giant Codelco made large gains during the boom. Artisan miners known as pirquineros also made considerable profits albeit some found it difficult to reskill to gold mining after copper prices fell in 2008.

==== Iron ====
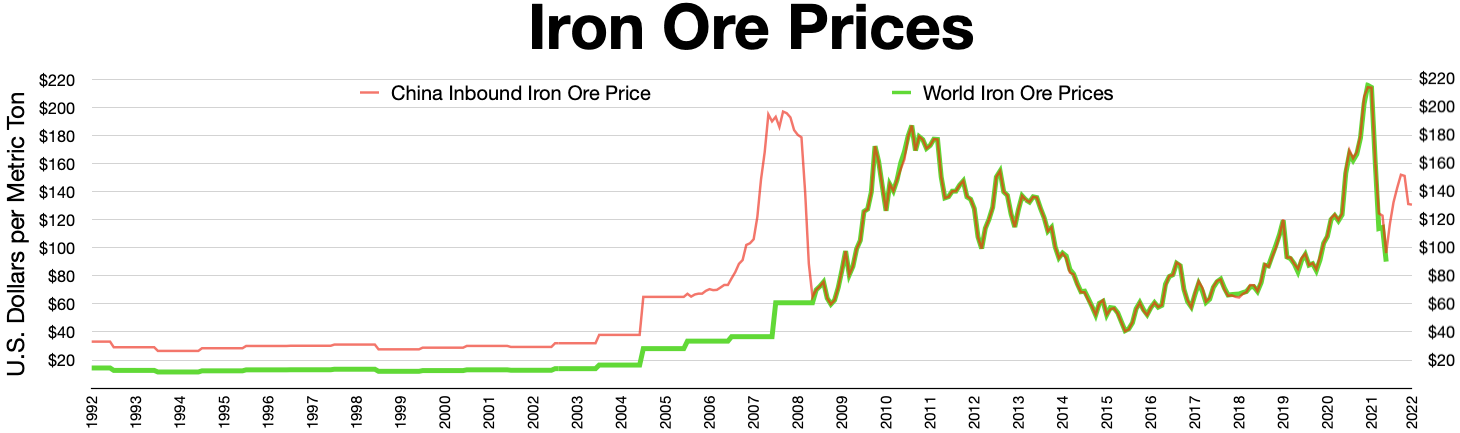
Iron ore prices China import/inbound iron ore spot price Global iron ore price

The prices of iron ore rose sharply from around $10 per tonne in 2003 to around $170 in April 2009 (transported to China). After that (written September 2013) the price was between $100 and $150; in September 2014 it started dropping precipitously, and was below $70 per ton in December 2014. The price of steel (at steel plants in Japan) has risen from around $300 per tonne in 2003 to $1,000 in late 2008, stabilizing at $800 in 2012.

The rise in prices made abandoned mines to reopen and new ones to open. It took some years to open mines, so some got a scaled up production around the time the prices dropped (drop partly caused by such production). Furthermore, started construction projects had to be finished so demand only reacted slowly to the rising prices.

The surge in the iron ore price resulted in boom-time conditions in Australia, and especially in Western Australia,the main source of China’s iron ore supply.

==== Lead ====
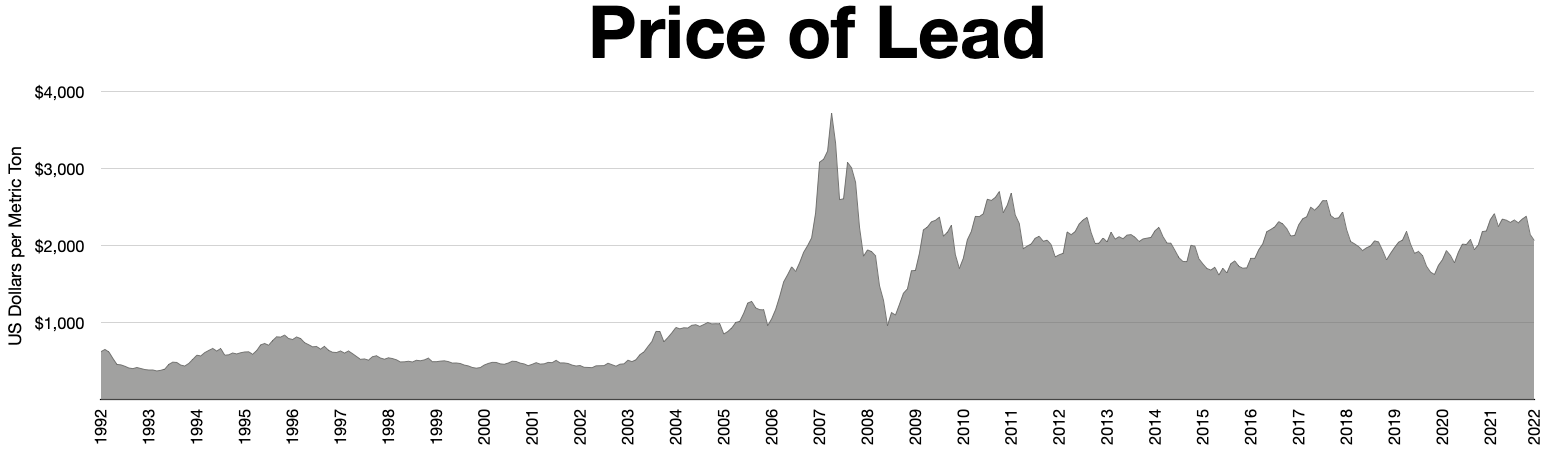
Price of lead US Dollars per Metric Ton

The price of lead rose sharply in early 2007, then collapsed to nearly their original starting price by the end of the next year. Lead prices began to rise in early 2007 due to increased worldwide demand. Prices were about $1,200 per tonne of lead in the July, then rose to $2,220 per tonne by September and collapsed back down to $1,200 per tonne in the October of that year. Despite the bullish market condition, the price had collapsed by the July 2009 and was only worth about $1,400 per tonne of lead.

The lead and zinc markets became rather bearish for several months afterwards. Prices were hovering at between $1,770 and $2,175 per tonne as the markets became more bullish and increased prices after China's car scrapping scheme had caused a general upturn in lead, zinc, cadmium and aluminium production. By the June 2010, prices stood at only $870 per tonne, and were back to about $2,200 in the July 2010.

==== Zinc ====
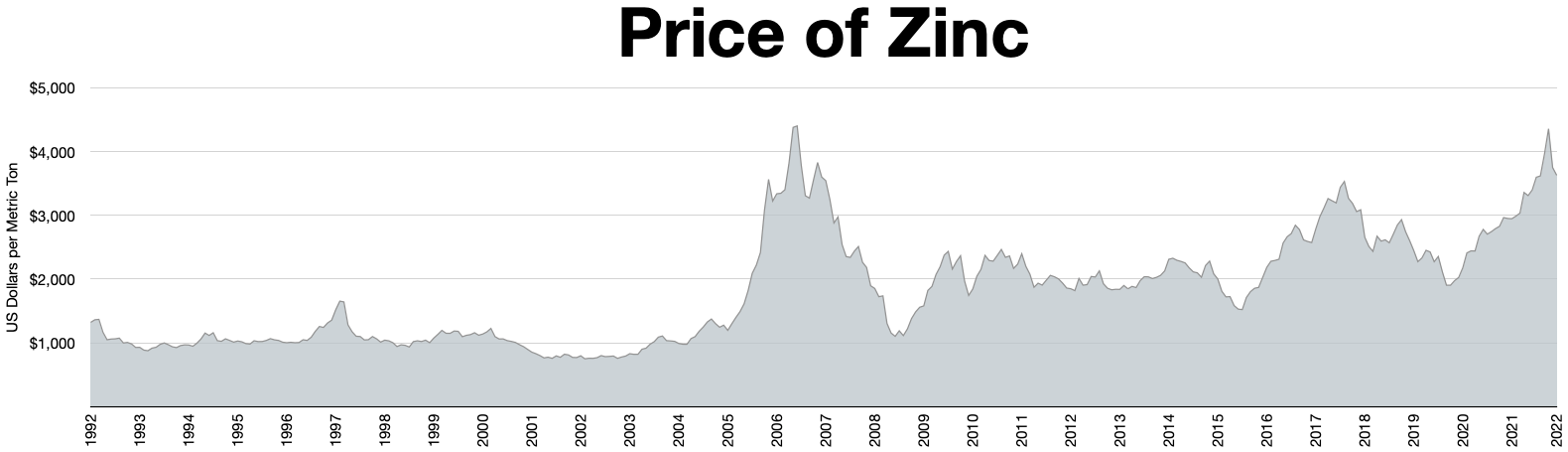
Price of Zinc

The price of zinc rose sharply in early 2007 after a five-year secular bear market, then collapsed to nearly their original starting price by the end of the next year. Zinc also exhibited similar bullish trading patterns as most metals did since 2004, but with a different overall price.

Zinc sale prices were 80 cents per pound in July 2008, which was typical of its 2004–2008 pricing levels. By January 2009 it had bottomed out and was worth 45 cents per lb. A spectacular bull market and increased Chinese interest in galvanised construction steel caused prices to top off at $1.20 per pound of metal by January 2010. It then quickly fell back to a routine 80 cents by July 2010.

Zinc is popular in manufacturing and building; its ability to create corrosion-resistant zinc plating of steel (hot-dip galvanizing) is the major application for zinc. Other applications are in batteries and alloys, such as brass. A variety of zinc compounds are commonly used, such as zinc carbonate and zinc gluconate (as dietary supplements), zinc chloride (in deodorants), zinc pyrithione (anti-dandruff shampoos), zinc sulfide (in luminescent paints), and zinc methyl or zinc diethyl in the organic laboratory.

==== Neodymium ====
Neodymium, a fairly rare metal which is used in high grade magnets, saw its prices rise due to increased demand, as were typical of this general market trend. The average price was $16.10 per kg in November and December 2009, but it began trading in June 2010 at $20–$45 per kg.

Neodymium serves as a constituent of high strength neodymium magnets, which are widely used in loudspeakers, computer hard drives, high power-per-weight electric motors (e.g. for those in hybrid cars) and in high efficiency generators (such as aircraft and wind turbine generators).

There was also a strong resurgence of interest in wind farms by the UK government between 2008 and 2010 due to the continuing fears of insecurity in Middle Eastern oil supplies to the industrialised nations and after the closure of several old and economically/environmentally unviable coal-fuelled power stations earlier that decade. This helped the price to rally in 2010.

==== Other metals ====
The cadmium, tantalum, manganese, thulium, tin, chromium, indium, columbium/niobium, cobalt, molybdenum and vanadium prices rose sharply in early 2007, then collapsed to nearly their original starting price by the end of the next year due to uncertainty about supplies matching the demand, especially those of the BRIC countries' electronics industries in iPods, computers, mobile phones, et al.

Niobium is used in the steel of gas pipe lines due to the alloy's high strength and low corrosion rate.

Battery recycling has helped bring down both the nickel and cadmium prices. About 86% of all cadmium production was used in batteries during 2009. The rapid growth of wind farms and heavy duty magnets has made neodymium prices rally again and both Brazil and China's renewed interest in high grade steel has improved the Vanadium price recently. The way these metal's prices rose and fell due to increased demand, were typical of this general market trend.

===== Baltic Dry Index =====
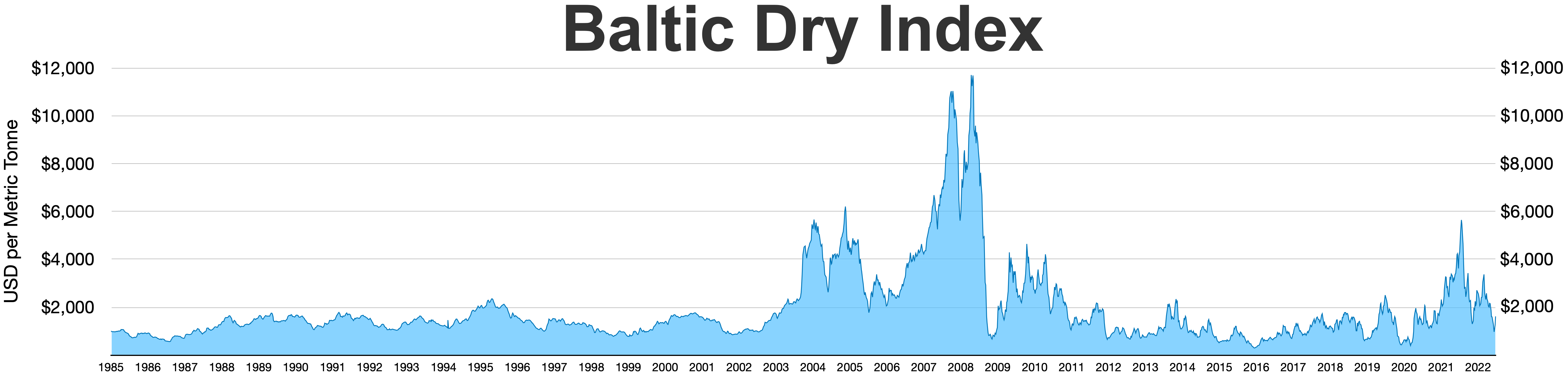
Baltic Dry Index 1985 - 2022

The Baltic Dry Index is a measure of the cost of shipping dry bulk goods around the world. It increased during the mid 2000s because of global demand for manufactured goods as well as rapidly growing Chinese demand for coal and iron ore. In 2008 the price of oil drove the index higher to an all time high of 11,440 points in May 2008. Because of the Great Recession the index dropped to 715 points in late 2008.

=== Chemicals ===
==== Sulphuric acid ====
In 2002, 95% pure sulphuric acid cost £55 and 90% acid cost £40 per tonne. Due to floods in Poland and increased demand in China, the acid's price soared to $329/tonne in May 2008, from just $90/tonne in October 2007. It has become steadily cheaper since the start of 2010.

Most industrial chemicals exhibited similar price trends due to bad weather in the EU and USA along with increased demand by the BRIC nations.

=== Non metals ===
==== Chlorine ====
Chlorine products such as P.V.C. plastics, caustic soda, industrial paper bleach and ordinary household and industrial bleachs saw their prices rise sharply in 2008 as a result of volatility on the world's chlorine market.

As a result of fight of supply and high operating rates in May 1997, two chlorine producers took the bold initiative of calling for an average price rise of $25 per short ton. Other producers were considering bringing the total price increase for the 1997 product year to date of up to $80 per short and fob ton, from $45–$50 per short and fob ton in May 1996. This occurred as both rapidly ascending demand from the vinyl polymer chain market and the unusually strong seasonal demand and no new production capacity on the immediate horizon coincided. The price increase had its firm foundations in the incumbent bullish market dynamics of the mid-2000s. Occidental Chemical Corporation suggested a minor rise as other firms took a "wait-and-see approach" and Russia raised production slightly to ease the cost of domestic bleach and swimming pool chloro-tablet costs.

Chlorine prices rose in May 2005 as both growing energy costs, shrinking supply and high market tariffs in the EU, NAFTA and Latin America, the increased use of chlorine-based chemicals for the aquatics industry. The price of chlorine caustic was $350 per dry short ton, up from $100 last March. Chlorine was priced at $330 per dry short ton, up $130 on 2008's price of $200.

The gas's price steadily increased throughout 2007 and early 2008 as demand for P.V.C. and some metals like copper, Neodymium and Tantalum rose due to the increased growth of the BRIC countries demand for electrical goods.

America's chlorine prices rose suddenly from about $125–$150 per ton fob between June and August 2009 months on a sharp rise in chlor-alkali production and capacity cuts after a year in which production quotes largely stay flat. The spot price surged more than 300% to about $475–$525 ton fob in August 2009. Both Russia and the European Union were also increasing chlorine production to stabilise world prices.

Non discounted American chlorine was priced at $390–410 short ton and discounted prices stood at $300 per short ton between November 2009 and February 2010. As the European chlorine production spiked in November to a daily output of 26,971 tonnes, before falling to 23,667 short ton in December due to the Christmas and New Year holidays. Production was about European production was 25.8% higher than December 2008 levels.

==== Cotton ====
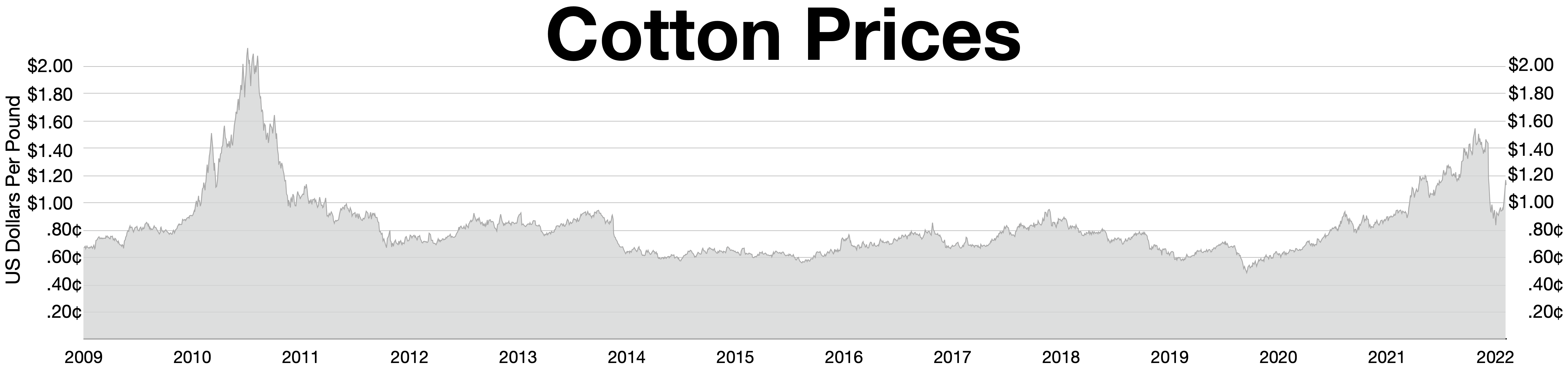
Cotton prices 2009-2022

The price of cotton was rising in 2010 and peaked in early 2011. India the worlds second largest exporter restricted shipments to help its domestic textiles industry

== Late-2000s economic fallout ==
Many firms, individuals, and hedge funds went bankrupt or suffered heavy losses due to purchasing commodities at high prices only to see their values decline sharply in mid to late 2008. Many manufacturing companies were also crippled by the rising cost of oil and other commodities such as transition metals.

The food and fuel crises were both discussed at the 34th G8 summit in July 2008.

=== The 2008 price glitch ===
In the second half of 2008, the prices of most commodities fell dramatically on expectations of diminished demand in the world recession and credit crunch. Prices began to rise again in late 2009 to mid-2010 (as supply could not meet demand), triggering another round of boom that lasted until the early 2010s, when fossil fuels and metals prices collapsed in a far more prolonged fashion that looks to far eclipse that of 2008.

=== Mine closures ===
The heavy price volatility caused a sudden boom then bust in the mining industry across the world, e.g. in Democratic Republic of the Congo, Zambia, Zimbabwe, Canada, China, Sweden and Australia. The $900,000,000 Tenke Fungurume copper-cobalt mining project in the Democratic Republic of Congo was cleared in February 2008 for building to start in a years time and then Luanshya Copper Mine in Zambia closed on 6 March 2009. Zimbabwe and Australia also saw nickel and copper mines open close during this time. China opened several new coal mines in Qinghai province during the years 2007 and 2008.

=== Opinions on the commodities bubble ===
Coincidentally, long-only commodity index funds started just before the bubbles, became popular at the same time – by one estimate investment increased from $90 billion in 2006 to $200 billion at the end of 2007, while commodity prices increased 71% – which raised concern as to whether these index funds caused the commodity bubble. The empirical research has been mixed.

In February 2008, analyst Gary Dorsch wrote:

Commodities have historically been regarded as wildly volatile and risky, but since 2006, crude oil, gold, copper, silver, platinum, cocoa, and grains have soared, hitting record highs, and have trounced returns in the mismanaged G-7 stock markets ... A remarkable run-up in prices of wheat, corn, oilseeds, rice, and dairy products, along with sharply higher energy prices, have been blamed on supply shortfalls, strong demand for bio-fuels, and an inflow of $150 billion from investment funds. From a year ago, Chicago wheat futures have soared +120%, corn +20%, and soybeans are +80% higher. Rough rice is up 55%, and platinum touched $2,000 /oz, up 80% from a year ago, while US cocoa futures hit a 24-year high ... Fund managers are pouring money into commodities across the board as a hedge against the explosive growth of the world's money supply, and competitive currency devaluations engineered by central banks.

Economist James D. Hamilton has argued that the increase in oil prices in the period of 2007 to 2008 was a significant cause of the recession. He evaluated several different approaches to estimating the impact of oil price shocks on the economy, including some methods that had previously shown a decline in the relationship between oil price shocks and the overall economy. All of these methods "support a common conclusion; had there been no increase in oil prices between 2007:Q3 and 2008:Q2, the US economy would not have been in a recession over the period 2007:Q4 through 2008:Q3". Hamilton's own model, a time-series econometric forecast based on data up to 2003, showed that the decline in GDP could have been successfully predicted to almost its full extent given knowledge of the price of oil. The results imply that oil prices were entirely responsible for the recession; however, Hamilton himself acknowledged that this was probably not the case but maintained that it showed that oil price increases made a significant contribution to the downturn in economic growth.

== Aftermath ==
In the mid-2010s, China experienced a stock market crash and economic slowdown as it moved from manufacturing to a services industry. Leftist pink tide governments in Latin America who created unsustainable policies based on China's commodity trade in the 2000s began to experience economic difficulties and began to experience a political decline as income diminished due to the end of the commodities boom. This downturn in commodities prices also had an important effect on non-left aligned countries in Latin America such as Mexico, Colombia, Peru or Chile, whose economies were largely dependent on mineral resource extraction by foreign companies, plummeting the economic growth in those years. However, these countries recovered economically when oil prices stabilized, unlike the Venezuelan economy. As oil prices declined, Russia also had its economy falter as a result of mismanagement.

== Synoptic chart on 1990–2010 prices ==
All prices are in either £, €, $/US$ or A$, depending on the nationality of sources available.

Commodity	Image	1990–2010 lowest price per unit	1990–2010 highest price per unit
Wheat		£11-£15 for discounted and slightly higher for non-discounted wheat (2007)	£91 for both (2010)
Recycled paper		£10 (2009)	$235 (2008)
Crude oil		$30 (2005)	$147.30 (2008)
Copper		$1,600 (1999)	$9,000 (2006)
Gold		$252.90 (1999)	Over $1900 (2011)
Aluminum		$0.45 (1998)	$1.50 (2006)
Platinum		$325 (1994)	$2,200 (2007)
Silver		$4 (1992)	$49.80 (April 2011)
Coal		A$72.00 (2009)	A$112.50 (2010)
Nickel		£8,300 (2009)	£36,700 (2007)
Uranium		$10 (2001)	$300 (2007)
Rhodium		$500 (1995–1997, 2002–2004)	$9,500 (2008)
Palladium		$200 (1992, 2002–2004)	$1,100 (2001)
Zinc		$0.45 (2009)	$1.20 (2010)
Neodymium		$16.10 (2000s)	$45 (2010)
Lead		$870 (2010)	$2,220 (2007)
Rhenium		$4,000–$4,500 (2010)	$6,000 (2009)
Chlorine		$45–$50 for both classes (1996)	$475–$525 (2009)
Sulfuric acid		£55 for 95% pure and £40 for 90% pure (2002)	$329 for both in (2008)

== See also ==
- 1970s commodities boom
- 2000s energy crisis
- 2007–2008 world food price crisis
- 2020s commodities boom
- Dot-com bubble
- Great Recession
- List of commodity booms
