= Gold mining in Chile =

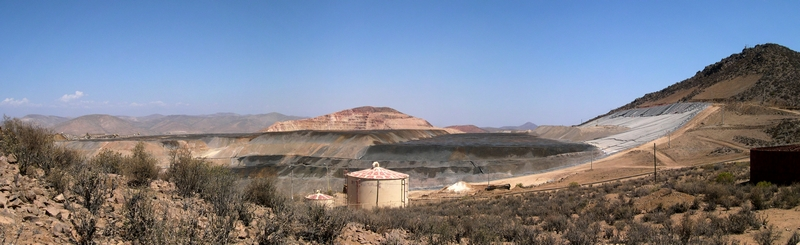
Gold mine in Andacollo,Coquimbo Region.

Location of the five mines that produces most gold in Chile.

The amount of gold mined in Chile has fluctuated in the 2010–2023 period from a high of 50,852 kg in 2013 to a low of 30,907 kg in 2022. Also in the same period 36% to 72% of the gold produced annually in Chile was a by-product of copper mining. Since 2018 large-scale copper mining has produced more than twice the amount of the gold produced by large-scale primary-gold mining. In the 2000s and 2010s the number of gold miners and people employed in the gold mining industry have diminished, making it the mining sector of Chile with most employment vulnerability.

Most of the economically viable gold deposits in Chile belong to two types of deposits; high-sulfidation epithermal and porphyry type. The bulk of these deposits formed in the last 66 millions years (Cenozoic) in connection to magmatic activity in the Andes. Gold from iron oxide copper gold ore deposits (IOCG), from mesothermal deposits, or of Mesozoic age (formed 66 to 252 million years ago) may in some cases be recurrent geological features but lack often large concentrations to make them profitable. Almost all valuable non-placer gold in Chile occur in the northern half of the country and some deposits are grouped into belts like the Maricunga Gold Belt and El Indio Gold Belt. Some challenges of gold mining in Chile include increasingly complex legal frameworks and the fact that important deposits lie below or next to glaciers along the Argentina–Chile border and have thus both issues relating to the bi-nationality and of environmental impacts on glaciers.

== Largest gold mines in Chile ==
Largest gold mines in Chile by production
Mine	Type	Primary product	Kg of gold	Year of production	Year of opening	Projected year of closure	Owners	Sources
Collahuasi	Open-pit	Copper	2,674	2023	1999	2106	Glencore (44%); Anglo American (44%); JCR (12%)	
Centinela	Open-pit	Copper	5,103	2023	2014	2068	Antofagasta plc	
Escondida	Open-pit	Copper	5,647	2023	1990	2078	BHP (57.5%); Rio Tinto (30%); JECO Corporation (10%); JECO 2 Ltd (2.5%)	
El Peñón	Underground	Gold	5,109	2023	1999	2031	Pan American Silver	
La Coipa	Open-pit	Gold	4,759	2023	1993	2032	Kinross Gold	

== Medium and small-scale gold mining ==
The share of medium and small-scale mining in gold production in Chile has dropped from an average of 45% for the 2003–2005 period to 9% in 2023, mainly as result of a decline in gold production but also to a lesser extent due to the increased gold recovered by large-scale mining.

Small-scale mining with gold as the primary product have had an annual produce ranging from 796 to 1145 kg gold in the 2014–2023 period, while medium-scale producers with copper as the primary product have an annual produce ranging from 1904 to 4002 kg gold in the same period. Almost no mining of placer gold occurs today. The placer deposits of some areas of difficult access in Patagonia are subject to sporadic small-scale illegal gold mining. A 2019 study found that seven of Chile's ten best placer gold prospects lie around Cordillera de Nahuelbuta.

== History ==
=== Pre-Columbine and Colonial eras (700–1810) ===
The earliest known gold mining in what is now Chile dates to c. 700 CE and is associated to the Diaguita and El Molle cultures.

Incas exploited placer gold in the northern half of Chile prior to the arrival of the Spanish. It has been claimed that the Inca Empire expanded into Diaguita lands because of its mineral wealth. This hypothesis was as of 1988 under dispute. An expansion of this hypothesis is that the Incas would have invaded the relatively well-populated Eastern Diaguita valleys (present-day Argentina) to obtain labour to send to Chilean mining districts. Archaeologists Tom Dillehay and Américo Gordon claim Incan yanakuna extracted gold south of the Incan frontier in free Mapuche territory. Following this thought, the main motive for Incan expansion into Mapuche territory would have been to access gold mines.

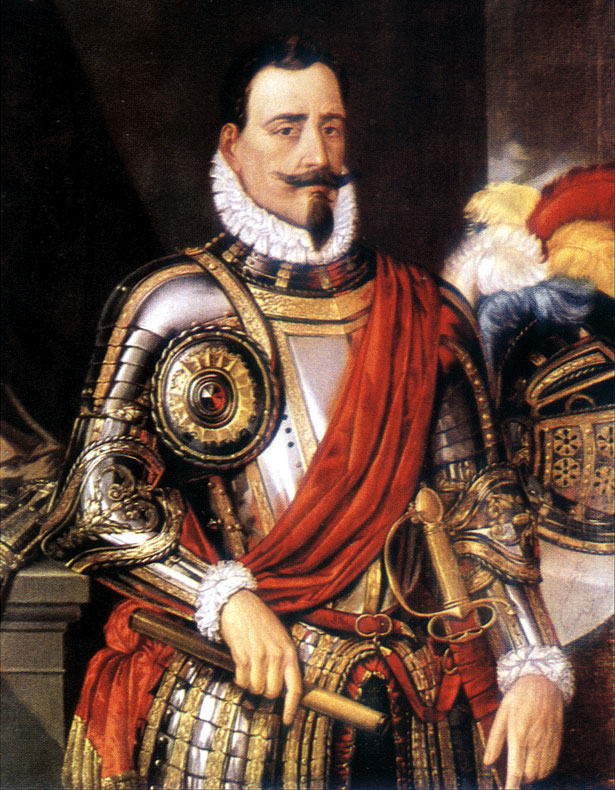
Pedro de Valdivia the conquistador that bought much of Chile under Spanish rule and initiated mining on behalf of the Spanish. Pedro Mariño de Lobera records that a common story in Chile at the time of Valdivia's death was that Valdivia had been killed by Mapuches that forced him to drink molten gold.

Early Spaniards extracted gold from placer deposits using indigenous labour. This contributed to cause the Arauco War, as native Mapuches lacked a tradition of forced labour like the Andean mita and largely refused to serve the Spanish. The key area of the Arauco War were the valleys around Cordillera de Nahuelbuta where the Spanish designs for this region was to exploit the placer deposits of gold using unfree Mapuche labour from the nearby and densely populated valleys. Deaths related to mining contributed to a population decline among native Mapuches. Another site of Spanish mining was the city of Villarrica. Here the Spanish mined gold placers and silver. The original site of the city was likely close to modern Pucón. However at some point in the 16th century it is presumed the gold placers were buried by lahars flowing down from nearby Villarrica volcano. This prompted settlers to relocate the city further west at its modern location.

While of less importance than gold districts in the south, the Spanish also carried out mining operations in Central Chile. There the whole economy was oriented towards mining. As indigenous populations in Central Chile declined to about 30% of their 1540s numbers towards the end of the 16th century and gold deposits became depleted, the Spanish of Central Chile begun to focus on livestock operations.

Mining activity declined in the late 16th century as the richest placer deposits, which are usually the most shallow, became exhausted. The decline was aggravated by the collapse of the Spanish cities in the south following the battle of Curalaba (1598) which meant for the Spaniards the loss of both the main gold districts and the largest indigenous labour sources. Gold mining became a taboo among Mapuches in colonial times, and gold mining often prohibited under the death penalty. Compared to the 16th and 18th centuries, Chilean mining activity in the 17th century was very limited. Gold production totaled as little as 350 kg over the whole century. Chile exported minor amounts of copper to the rest of the Viceroyalty of Peru in the 17th century. But Chile saw an unprecedented revival of its mining activity in the 18th century, with annual gold production rising from 400 to 1000 kg over the course of the century. Gold, silver and copper from Chilean mining begun to be exported directly to Spain via the Straits of Magellan and Buenos Aires in the 18th century.

=== Republican era (1810–1974) ===
In 1879 an expedition led by Chilean Navy officer Ramón Serrano Montaner discovered gold in some watercourses of western Tierra del Fuego. In 1880–1881 enterprises and mining camps at the gold fields discovered by Montaner's expedition were established. The Tierra del Fuego gold rush was triggered in 1884 when the French steamship Arctique ran aground on the northern coast of Cape Virgenes, in Argentina near the border with Chile. The gold rush reached the Chilean islands south of Beagle Channel so that by 1893 over one thousand men, most of them Dalmatians, lived there. However, by 1894 gold extraction begun to decline in these islands and deposits became gradually depleted. A number of enterprises formed in the 1900s to extract gold from the islands south of Beagle Channel ended with meager results.

At the turn of the century back-and-forth implementation and removal of the gold standard in Chile caused concurrent periods of upswing and decline of gold mining in Chile.

The devastating consequences of the Great Depression in Chile in the labour market led to a revival of gold ming in Cordón Baquedano by Chilote and Croatian pirquineros in the 1930s.

The locality of Andacollo, near the port of Coquimbo, was subject to gold rush in the early 1930s when there was a large inflow of gold miners exploiting local placer deposits. While gold mining declined in the late 1930s, around 1935 Andacollo produced as much as 43% of all placer gold of Chile causing a shortage of water needed for processing.

=== Modern times (1974–present) ===
In the 1970s geologist from ENAMI investigated the deposits of El Indio leading to breakthrough discovery of an extensive gold deposit associated to Cenozoic volcanism that was unheard of in Chile at the time. This discovery led to the establishment of Chile's first large mine where gold was the main mineral and it also ushered a wave of mineral exploration in the Chilean high Andes led by Canadian mining companies. In the 1980s gold mining surged in Chile with the opening of the mines of El Indio and Guanaco. A government initiative to stimulate gold mining known as Plan Aurífero Nacional was in place from 1983 to 1986.

Gold production in Chile peaked in 2000. The closure of El Indio mine in 2002 was for long considered the last major mine closure in Chile until copper mine Cerro Colorado was put on hold in 2023.

== Bibliography ==
- Martinic Beros, Mateo (1973). Crónica de las tierras del sur del Canal Beagle (in Spanish). Editorial Francisco de Aguirre.
- Millán, Augusto (1996). Evaluación y factibilidad de proyectos mineros (in Spanish). Editorial Universitaria. ISBN 956-11-1241-8.
- Millán, Augusto (2006). La minería metálica en Chile en el siglo XX [Metal Mining in Chile in the Twentieth Century] (in Spanish). Santiago de Chile: Editorial Universitaria. ISBN 956-11-1849-1.
- Salazar, Gabriel; Pinto, Julio (2002). Historia contemporánea de Chile III. La economía: mercados empresarios y trabajadores. LOM Ediciones. ISBN 956-282-172-2.
- Villalobos, Sergio; Silva, Osvaldo; Silva, Fernando; Estelle, Patricio (1974). Historia De Chile (14th ed.). Editorial Universitaria. ISBN 956-11-1163-2.
