= Great Depression in Chile =

The Great Depression that begun 1929 was felt strongly in Chile from 1930 to 1932. Saltpetre and copper exports collapsed. The World Economic Survey of the League of Nations declared Chile the worst affected nation by the depression. Such economic devastation worsened Chile's economic prosperity, highlighted particularly in 1932 that exemplifies a rapid fall in exports, imports, GDP and the value of industrial production from pre-depression levels. Chiles exports dropped from US$279m in 1929 to US$35m in 1932, which in real terms corresponds to 1/6 of export level in 1929. In accordance to this time period, Chile's imports fell from US$197m in 1929 to US$26m in 1932 (Thorp 1984, p. 333). Similarly, real GDP dropped from 100 in 1929 to 67 in 1932, contributed by the fall of the value of production from 100 in 1929 to 77 in 1932 alongside a rapid decrease in the average annual production that reached the equivalent to one quarter of 1929 levels in December 1932. Alongside a decrease in employment in the mining sector, in terms of GDP and productive activity, mining dropped to 26.3 in 1932 from 1929 levels of 100.

Chile's economic struggles during the Depression were further compounded by a decrease of foreign loans. This contributed to an increase in Chile's budget deficit and reduced government revenue, resultant of their heavy reliance on Foreign financial support, in particular US support, to drive Economic growth pre-depression. Whilst Chile in 1929 received a total of US$338 million of foreign loans, in 1932 it only received US 23 million. In this same period, Chile's budget deficit rose from 31% of total expenditure in 1931 to 37% in 1932.

== Political impact and response ==
The crisis caused the authoritarian regime of Carlos Ibáñez del Campo to fall in July 1931 followed by a succession of short-lived governments until the election of Arturo Alessandri in December 1932. The state responded to the crisis by gradually raising tariffs, increasing internal demand and increasing control over the "flux and use" of foreign currency. Quotas and licences were established for imports and the gold convertibility was once again abolished in 1931.

These policies contributed to an industrial recovery and for the industry to already by 1934 surpass the levels of activity of 1929. In the 1930s the massive industrial growth was spearheaded by the textile industry, but non-metallic mining, chemical industries and machine and transport factories did also expand. Overall industry recovered and expanded faster than the traditional exports in the post depression period.

== Migration, unemployment and social consequences ==
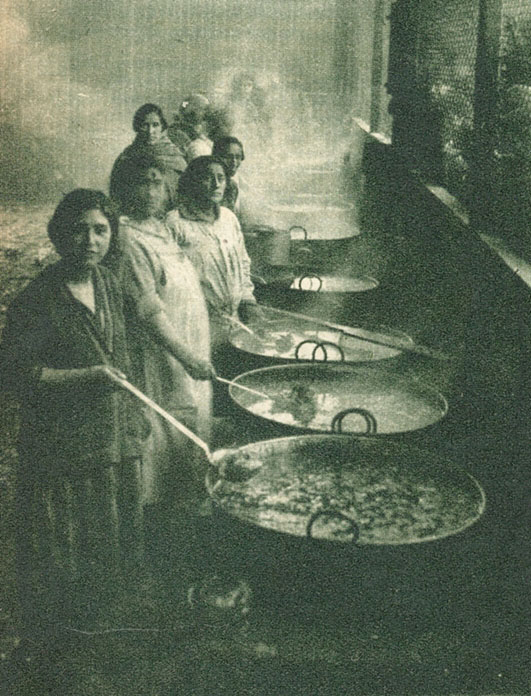
Soup kitchen to feed the unemployed in 1932.

During this period of the Great depression, Chile's sluggish economic growth throughout 1929-1932 is further representative of the rising unemployment and decrease in the production of nitrate. A decrease in employment in Chile's mining sector is exemplified from 1929 to 1932, in which the number of workers in 1932 stood at less than one third of 1929 figures of 91000. More specifically, in the nitrate sector alone 50,000 workers were unemployed by 1932 High rates of unemployment, caused by a fragile export economy saw an increase in geographical mobility of the working class, exemplified between September 1930 to February in 1931 where 46,459 people left nitrate fields to the main cities of Chile, such as Santiago and other provincial cities. Miners constituted around 6% of the active population but made up more than half of the unemployed during the crisis. Numerous soup kitchens sprang up in Santiago while homeless people begun to dwell in caves in the hills around Santiago. Thus, the working class was primarily subject to the social consequences, such as poverty, created by this rise in unemployment and deterioration of mining exports, in particular nitrate, during the Depression. Working class struggle combined with economic decline lead to the printing of more money by Chile's president Juan Antonio Montero in April 1932. This allowed the government to pay $152 million pesos towards government expenses, public works and public aid for the unemployed.

The depression caused an increase in artisanal gold mining in the country as unemployed people flocked to gold mining districts. The town of Andacollo in north-central Chile was subject to gold rush in the early 1930s when there was a large inflow of gold miners exploiting local placer deposits. While gold mining declined in the late 1930s, around 1935 Andacollo produced as much as 43% of all placer gold of Chile causing a shortage of water needed for processing. In Tierra del Fuego the depression led to an immigration of empoverished people that reactivated gold mining that had been in decline since the gold rush of 1883–1906. This mining was mainly carried out around Cordón Baquedano by artisan miners known as pirquineros. Responding to the need of these miners the Chilean state created Lavaderos de Oro, an institution that provided tools and subsidized the activity of the miners.

== Bibliography ==
- Drinot, Paulo & Knight Alan (2014). The Great Depression in Latin America.
- Salazar, Gabriel; Pinto, Julio (2002). Historia contemporánea de Chile III. La economía: mercados empresarios y trabajadores. LOM Ediciones. ISBN 956-282-172-2.
- Thorp, Rosemary (2000). Latin America in the 1930s: the role of the periphery in world crisis. Palgrave Macmillan.
- Villalobos, Sergio; Silva, Osvaldo; Silva, Fernando; Estelle, Patricio (1974). Historia De Chile (14th ed.). Editorial Universitaria. ISBN 956-11-1163-2.
