= Tierra del Fuego Gold Rush =

1884–1906 gold rush in Argentina and Chile

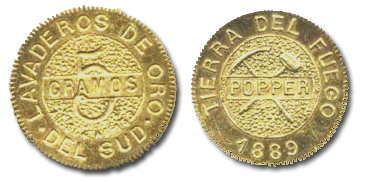
- An 1889 5-gram gold coin from Tierra del Fuego by Julius Popper
- Date: 1884–1906
- Location: Tierra del Fuego, Argentina and Chile
- Cause: Rescue expedition for the French steamship Arctique discovered gold on the northern coast of Cape Virgenes
- Participants: Chilean miners Argentine miners Dalmatian miners Other European miners
- Outcome: Miners formed the first towns in the Tierra del Fuego; Expansion of the Patagonian sheep farming boom Escalation of the Selk'nam genocide

Location of Punta Arenas and some of the principal gold findings.

Between 1884 and 1906, a gold rush in Tierra del Fuego attracted many Chilean, Argentine, and Dalmatian miners to the archipelago. The gold rush led to the settlement of the first towns in Tierra del Fuego and fueled economic growth in Punta Arenas. As gold desposites declined, most miners left the archipelago, while the remaining settlers engaged in sheep farming and fishing.

The conflict for land and resources between miners and indigenous Fuegians escalated the ongoing Selkʼnam genocide. The emergence of brothels for settlers led to the widespread human traffficking and sexual enslavement of indigenous women.

== Early discoveries ==
Early attempts to find gold centered in the rivers next to Punta Arenas which drain Brunswick Peninsula to the Strait of Magellan. Small finds occurred in 1869, and in 1870 the governor of Magallanes Óscar Viel sent a 35-gram gold nugget to Chilean president José Joaquín Pérez as a gift. From April 1870 to April 1871 at least 15 kg of gold were mined near Punta Arenas. Most gold ended up in Valparaíso and the ships that engaged in commerce in the increasingly busy port of Punta Arenas.

=== English expeditions ===
In the 1870s, English settlers in the Falkland Islands moved to Punta Arenas in search for gold. Among them, John G. Hamilton and Federico Shanklin established an expedition to Punta Arenas to mine gold. Hamilton and Shanklin were well-known veterans of the California gold rush and Australian gold rush. However, Hamilton and Shanklin did not discover large amounts of gold and their expedition disbanded.

=== Chilean expeditions ===
In 1879, Chilean Navy officer Ramón Serrano Montaner led an expedition along the western coast of Tierra del Fuego. The Chilean expedition discovered modest gold deposits, establishing mining camps at the gold fields in 1880 and 1881.

== Gold rush ==
On the night of 23-24 September, 1884, the French steamship Arctique ran aground on the northern coast of Cape Virgenes, along the Argentina–Chile border and across from Tierra de Fuego. An expedition sent for its rescue discovered gold in Zanja a Pique. The news traveled to Punta Arenas, where many inhabitants left for Zanja a Pique. When Argentine acquired the mining rights for Zanja a Pique, the gold was largely depleted and the gold fields were abandoned.

== News reaches Buenos Aires ==
In Zanja a Pique, early miners purportedly extracted more than ten kilograms in less than one month. These reports circulated back to Punta Arenas and from there reached Buenos Aires. In Buenos Aires, the city's newspapers compared the gold findings to Australian gold rush and California gold rush. The news motivated residents to form companies to prospect for gold in the Tierra del Fuego.

=== Popper expedition ===
Mining engineer Julio Popper was contracted by one of these companies in Buenos Aires. Popper recruited Dalmatian immigrants in Buenos Aires to man his expedition. With these foreign workers, Popper set out to exploit the findings of El Páramo in San Sebastián Bay. Another camp was established in Sloggett Bay at the southern coast of Isla Grande de Tierra del Fuego.

==== Decline ====
The gold rush reached the Chilean islands south of Beagle Channel by 1893, with over 1,000 miners residing there. However, by 1894 gold extraction dwindled as deposits gradually depleted. By the early 1900s, many gold mining enterprises from the islands south of Beagle Channel shuttered with meager results.

== Contribution to the Selk'nam genocide ==
The Popper expedition killed the local Selk'nam population to clear and claim land for gold prospecting, contributing to the Selkʼnam genocide.

=== Sexual violence against indigenous women ===
Around the island, gold diggers, sheep herders, and government officials assaulted Selk'nam camps to acquire their women. The repeated kidnappings created a shortage of women among Fuegian tribes, which escalated inter-tribal conflicts between rival groups.

The shortage of women reportedly led to an emerging human trafficking industry among miners and indigenous Fuegians. By 1894, the town of Porvenir consisted of five houses, two of them liquor stores and a third one a brothel.

== Legacy ==
The gold rush improved the geographic understand of the poorly known islands south of Beagle Channel and linked them to Punta Arenas. Gold extracted from Tierra del Fuego generally passed through without improving the local economy. However, the gold extracted from the islands south of Beagle Channel ended up in Punta Arenas, where it fueled economic growth.

=== Dalmatian miners ===
Dalmatian miners gradually abandoned mining as gold desposits declined. These miners largely returned to Dalmatia or Buenos Aires, while some establish themselves in Punta Arenas.

=== Future mining efforts ===
The Chilean labor market was devastated by Great Depression. The sluggish labor market led to a renewed interest in gold mining in Tierra del Fuego. Chilote and Dalmatian pirquineros opened new gold mines in Cordón Baquedano during the 1930s.

== See also ==
- Boundary treaty of 1881 between Chile and Argentina
- Chilean silver rush
- Chileans in the California gold rush
- German colonization of Valdivia, Osorno and Llanquihue
- Gold mining in Chile
