= Pirquinero =

Traditional mining occupation of the Andes Mountains

In Chile and nearby areas of Argentina and Bolivia a pirquinero (from Quechua pircca) is a miner who extracts minerals in a traditional manner and is usually independent. A charactistic of the pirquineros is that they are involved in a wide range of stages of the production including mineral prospecting, extraction and processing. The activity is typically associated with low capital investments and the use of rudimentary technology. There are pirquineros that work on gold, copper and, in the localities of south-central Chile of Coronel and Lota, coal. The Norte Chico region of Chile is historically the place with most intense pirquinero activity. More specifically pirquineros in Chile concentrate in the communes of Diego de Almagro, Andacollo, Vallenar, Copiapó, Tocopilla, Chañaral and Taltal.

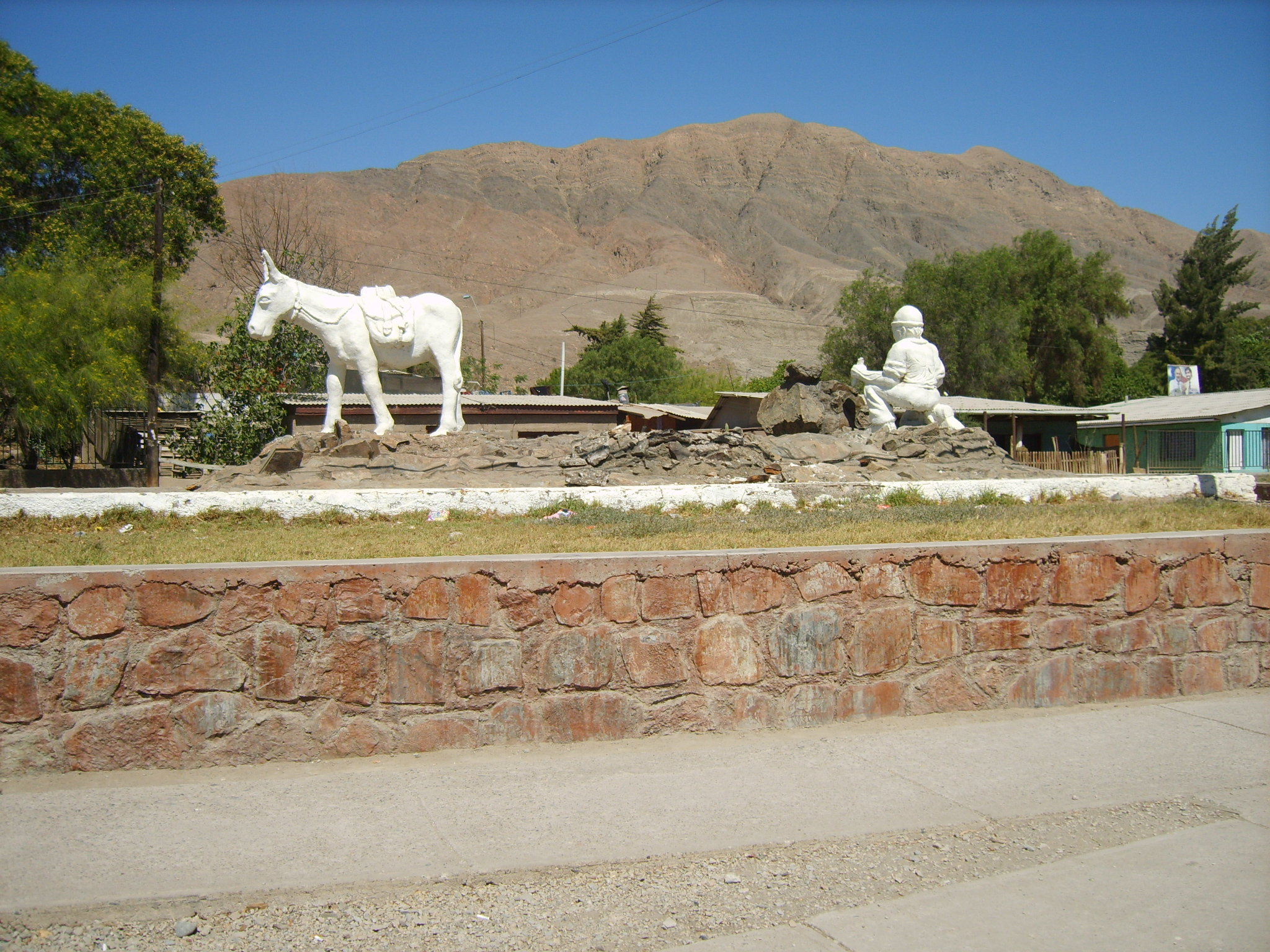
Monumento al pirquinero in Tierra Amarilla, Atacama Region.

For legal purposes any workforce of more than six persons is too large to be considered pirquineros in Chilean legislation. Pirquineros in Chile have since 1984 a workplace insurance against occupational injury and illnesses. In Chile the pirquineros usually sell their output to middlemen or directly to ENAMI (National Mining Enterprise).

Some media have tended to equate pirquineros with illegal miners, but their activity is legal and recognised by the Chilean state. The term chucullero is sometimes used pejoratively for pirquineros who are illegal miners, but this is not always the case as chucullero also refers more generally to any pirquinero specialized in precious metals, mostly gold.

== Techniques, training and lifestyle ==
Small, high-grade, unexploited deposits such as narrow veins in abandoned mines are one of the main targets of pirquineros and scavanging waste rock dumps through pallaqueo in these sites is usually a secondary activity. Pallaqueo is the hand selection of ore fragments for processing which allows to increase the over-all grade of the processed ore. A type of estimation of ore grade in use by pirquineros is called puruñar or cachear and consists of putting finely crushed rock in a bull's horn split in half and diluting it in water. Then the content is poured over to a bottle cap which allows for a visual estimation of small gold grains in the rock. The profit made by pirquineros is highly variable and investments carry high uncertainties. Despite these adversities some pirquineros value their trade for the independence and liberty they enjoy compared to paid employment.

Pirquineros are skilled workers albeit since mining different mineral resources are associated with different skills reconversion within the field may be difficult. Knowledge of the trade is usually passed down from older to younger generations in a family and many operations are family business.

== History ==
Historically pirquinero activity have had many ups and downs depending on the price of metals and economic crisis such as the Great Depression. Some pirquineros would reconvert into farmers when metal prices were low. Historically pirquineros have often faced some degree of opposition from wealthy mining interests dating at least back to the 18th century. Before mineral exploration became commonplace among mining companies in the late 1940s and 1950s, pirquineros and other small miners were crucial to identify new prospects.

From 1974 onwards the output of pirquineros have been drastically overshadowed by those of large mining companies formed by foreign investment that entered the country following the Decreto Ley 600. Since at least the late 20th century pirquinero activity and lifestyle is in decline. However, the 2000s commodities boom made copper mining particularly profitable among pirquineros from 2004 to 2008.

== Main legislation impacting pirquinero activity ==
- Decreto Fuerza de Ley 19 (Chile, 1984) – Pirquineros granted workplace insurance against occupational injury and illnesses.
- Ley N° 19.719 (Chile, 2001) – Sets the maximum number of pirquineros in a team at six.

== See also ==
- Chileans in the California gold rush
- Chilean mill
- Gold mining in Chile
- Guaire miners
- Juan Godoy
- The Aragonese
- Tierra del Fuego gold rush
