= Cape Virgenes =

Southeastern tip of continental Argentina

Coordinates: 52°20′00″S 68°21′15″W

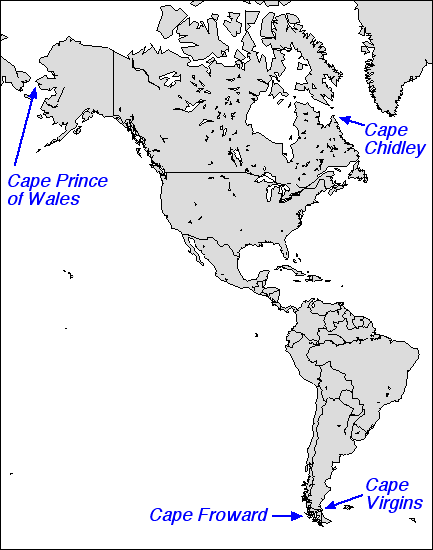
Capes in the Americas

Cape Virgenes (Spanish: Cabo Vírgenes, lit. 'Cape Virgins') is the southeastern promontory of continental Argentina in South America. A little to the south-west, the southernmost point of land is Punta Dúngeness. Ferdinand Magellan reached it on 21 October 1520 during the Spanish expedition to East Asia and discovered a strait, now called the Strait of Magellan in his honor. As 21 October was the feast day of Saint Ursula and the Eleven Thousand Virgins, he named the cape in their honor.

Its location is the southern 52nd parallel and is an approximate antipode to Amsterdam (located at the 52nd parallel of the northern hemisphere).

The Cape is located in Santa Cruz Province, Patagonia, Argentina. The Cape Virgenes Argentine Lighthouse has been operating since 1904. In 1884, gold was found there sparking the Tierra del Fuego gold rush. Recently, rises in the number of southern right whales visiting the area have been confirmed.

== Climate ==
Climate data for Cape Virgenes
Month	Jan	Feb	Mar	Apr	May	Jun	Jul	Aug	Sep	Oct	Nov	Dec	Year
Daily mean °C (°F)	10.2 (50.4)	10.4 (50.7)	9.1 (48.4)	6.4 (43.5)	4.1 (39.4)	2.5 (36.5)	2.2 (36.0)	2.7 (36.9)	3.8 (38.8)	6.1 (43.0)	8.0 (46.4)	9.5 (49.1)	6.3 (43.3)
Mean daily minimum °C (°F)	6.7 (44.1)	6.6 (43.9)	5.0 (41.0)	3.0 (37.4)	1.3 (34.3)	0.1 (32.2)	0.0 (32.0)	0.2 (32.4)	0.9 (33.6)	2.6 (36.7)	4.1 (39.4)	5.9 (42.6)	3.0 (37.4)
Record low °C (°F)	0.0 (32.0)	0.5 (32.9)	−1.2 (29.8)	−4.8 (23.4)	−6.0 (21.2)	−7.0 (19.4)	−6.0 (21.2)	−4.5 (23.9)	−4.0 (24.8)	−2.6 (27.3)	−1.0 (30.2)	−3.0 (26.6)	−7.0 (19.4)
Average precipitation mm (inches)	43 (1.7)	17 (0.7)	22 (0.9)	14 (0.6)	22 (0.9)	14 (0.6)	24 (0.9)	20 (0.8)	12 (0.5)	8 (0.3)	29 (1.1)	24 (0.9)	249 (9.8)
Average relative humidity (%)	76	73	77	81	84	87	86	84	79	73	73	73	79
Source: Secretaria de Mineria

== Gallery ==
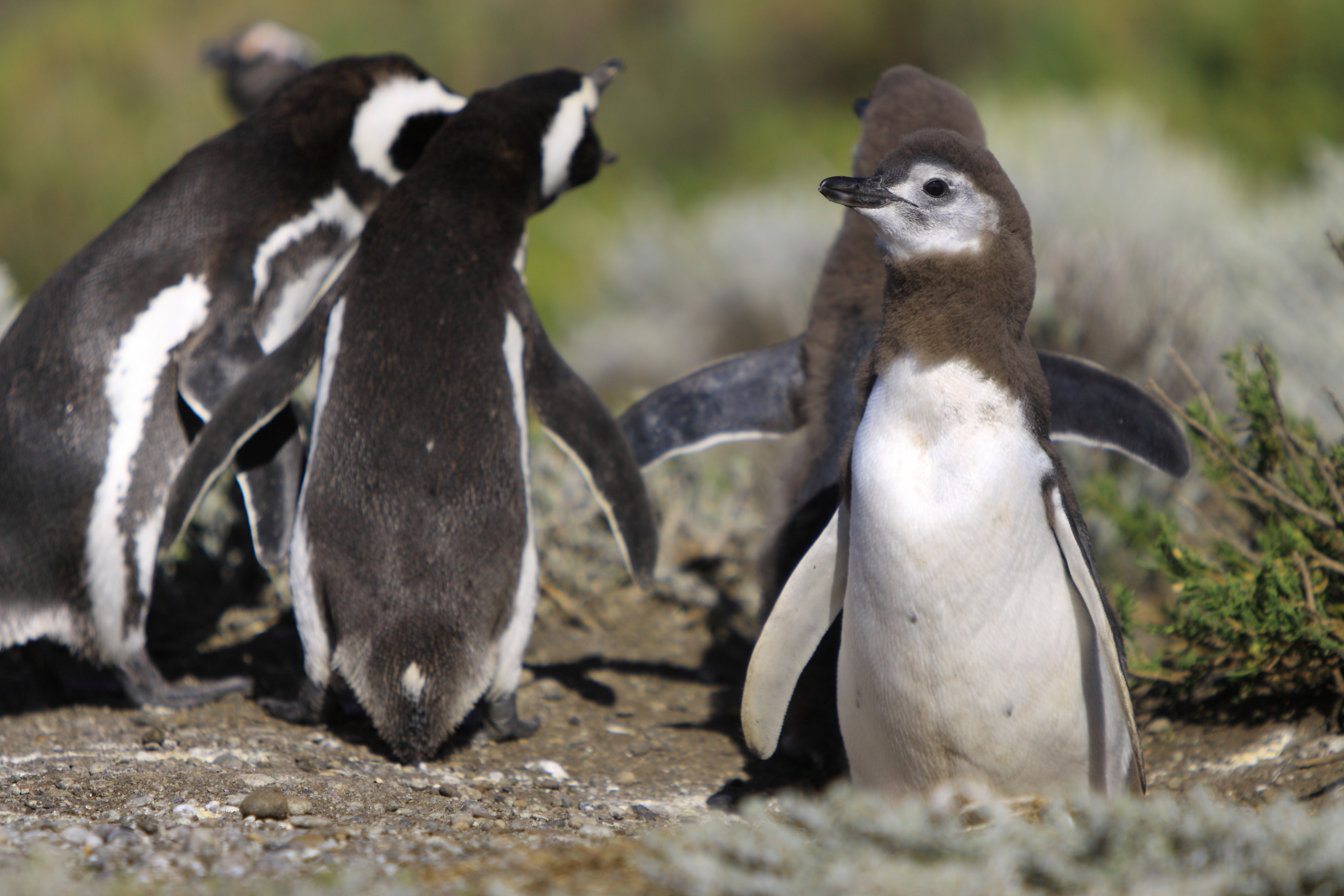
Magellanic penguins by their burrow in Cape Virgenes

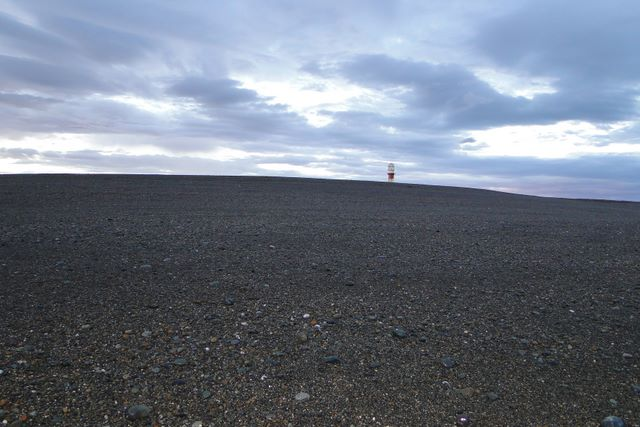
Sunset on Cape Virgenes
