= Cordón Baquedano =

Geography
- Country: Chile
- Region: Magallanes
- Range coordinates: 53°18′S 70°14′W
- Parent range: Andes

Cordón Baquedano is a low mountain range in the Chilean portion of Tierra del Fuego. The range is located in the northern part of the main island limiting to Inútil Bay to the south and grading over to lowlands to north before reaching the Straits of Magellan at Primera and Segunda Angostura. The highest part of the range reaches little over almost 600 m.a.s.l.

The range is an Important Bird Area, notable for the white-bridled finch.
