= William Otway =

William Otway may refer to:

- William Beauclerc Otway, merchant, mineralogist, gold-miner and quartz-crusher
- William Otway (cricketer), English cricketer

== See also ==
- Loftus William Otway, British Army general
