= William Beauclerc Otway =

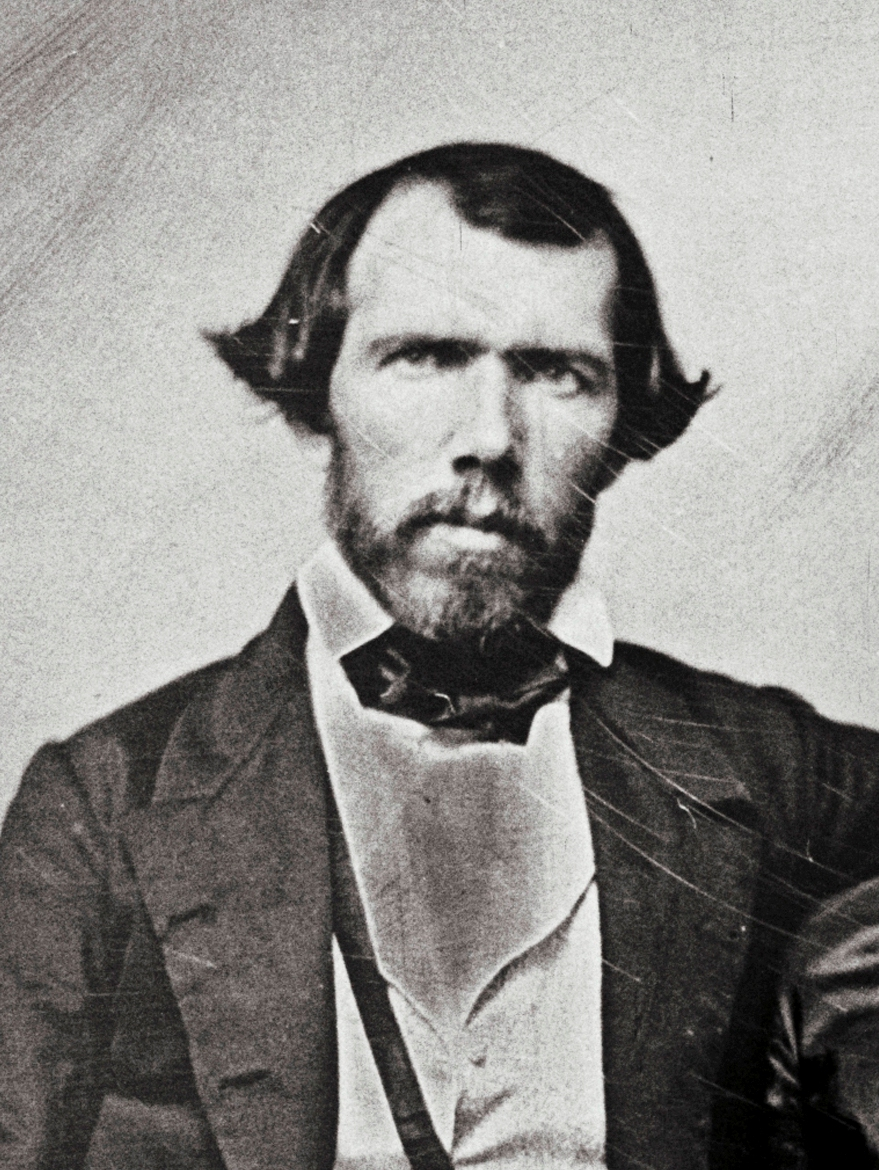
- Dauggereotype c.1860
- Born: 14 July 1819; New Orleans, Louisiana
- Died: Unknown; Australia
- Spouse: Rebecca Chapman (Raby) Abrams
- Children: Willie Dow Otway

William Beauclerc Otway (14 July 1819 – after 1866) was a mid-nineteenth-century American dragoon, overland emigrant, merchant, mineralogist, gold-miner and quartz-crusher. He is credited with being the first person to crush quartz for gold at Ballarat and for an early attempt to mine and process silver ore at St Arnaud.

== United States ==
Born in 1819, Otway joined the US Army Second Dragoons in May 1840 at the age of twenty, enlisting at New York. He served for a single five-year stint and was discharged at New Orleans having attained the rank of second sergeant. Some years later he participated in the California Gold Rush before settling in Portland, Oregon Territory, where he became a merchant.

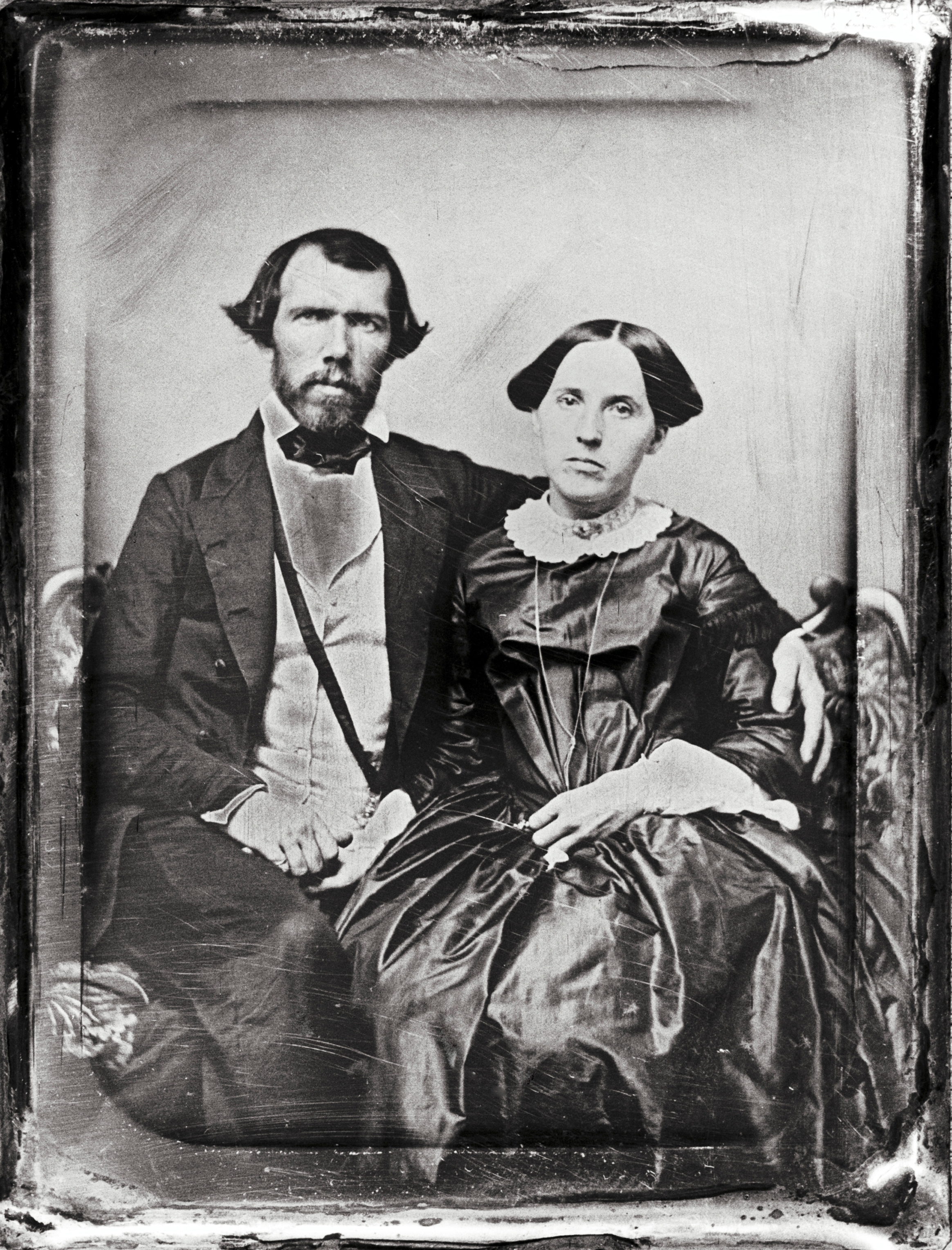
'Willie' and Rebecca c.1860

He married Rebecca Abrams in San Francisco on 28 July 1852.

== Australia ==
The Otways sailed to Australia in 1853, disembarking at Melbourne on 27 December and arriving at Ballarat three weeks later where they built a home on top of Black Hill.

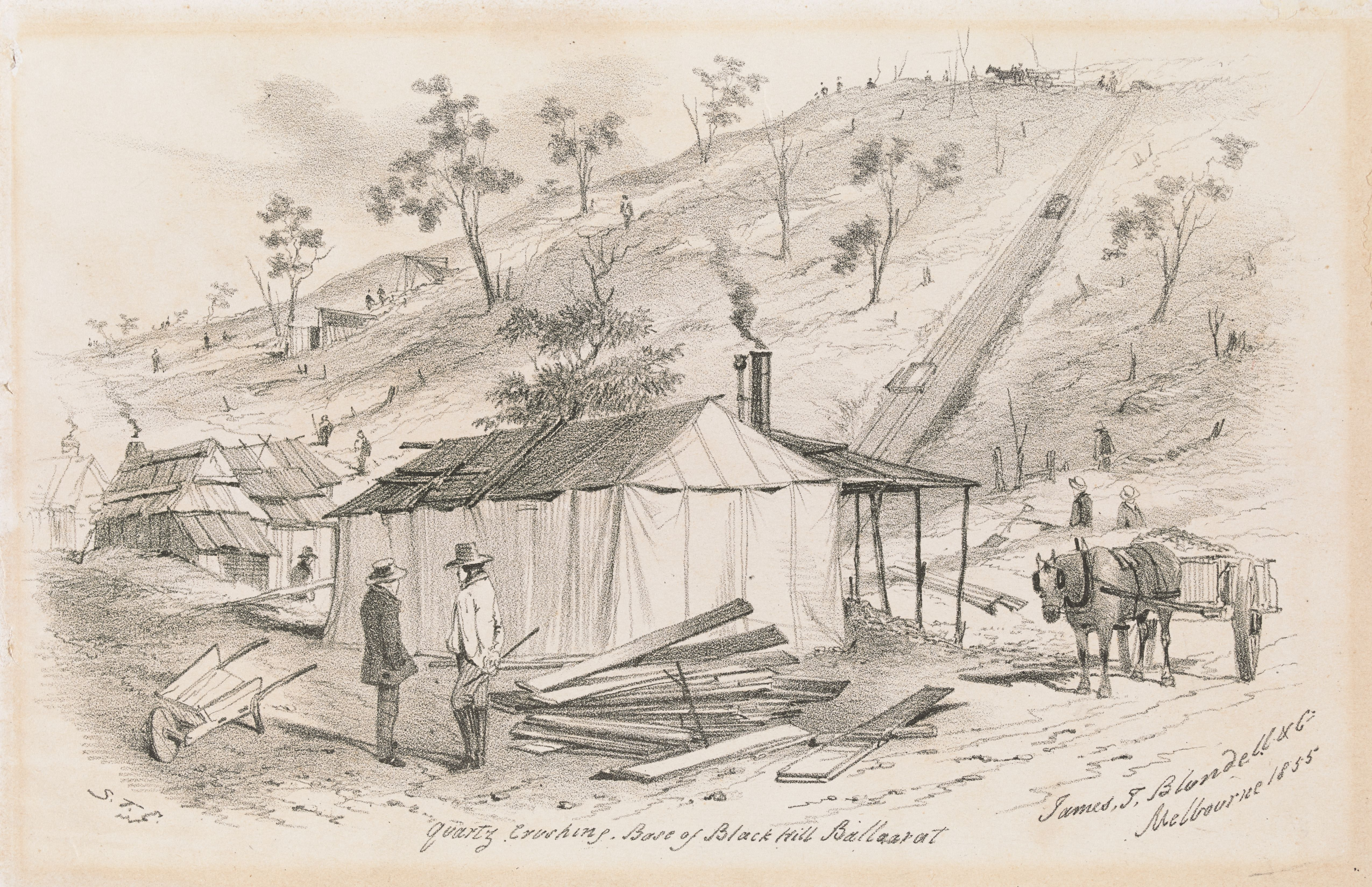
Otway's mill at Black Hill.

Otway chaired a dinner honouring US Consul James M. Tarleton on 28 November 1854 held to show American support for the government in the face of increasing agitation by the miners in the lead-up to the Eureka Rebellion.

Three weeks after the Eureka Rebellion Otway gave evidence at the Gold Fields Commission of Enquiry. He was not questioned about the rebellion, and the bulk of his evidence was about the practicalities of mining and its regulation. Notably, he states that his was the only quartz-crushing venture then at Ballarat, and he is often credited with being the first to mechanically crush quartz at Ballarat. He publicly launched his patented "improved" Chilean mill in January 1855, but the venture appears to have failed commercially. 'Willie' and Rebecca moved to Steiglitz, where his only son, Willie Dow Otway, was born on 16 January 1858. A quartz reef at Steiglitz was originally named after Otway, but was later renamed as the Copenhagen.

Otway's Alpha Silver Mining Company, formed in 1861, was the second mining company at St Arnaud and the first to attempt to specifically mine for silver. After considerable investment in leases and equipment, the mine was acknowledged as a failure by 1863, and the assets sold off in 1864.

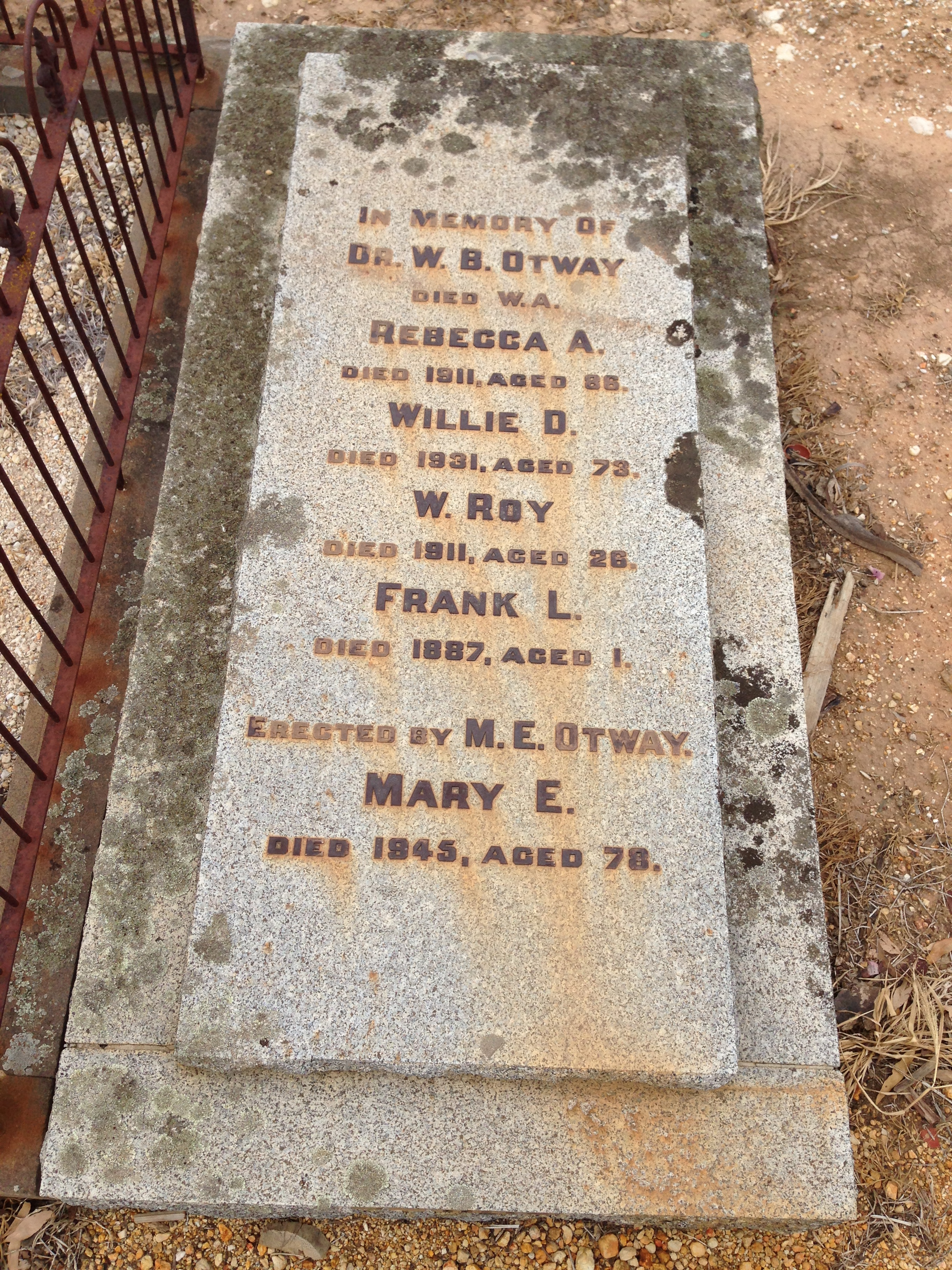
Grave of Frank L. Otway and memorial to other Otway family members at St Arnaud cemetery.

There is no known record of Otway's death. The memorial to him and his family in St Arnaud cemetery suggests his family believed he may have gone to Western Australia.

== Legacy ==
Otway Street in Ballarat, Victoria, and Otway Creek near Mangana, Tasmania, were named after him.

== See also ==
- Second Dragoons
- Ballarat History
- Eureka Rebellion
