= Croatian Chileans =

Chileans of full or partial Croatian descent

Chileno-croatas Hrvatski Čileanci

Total population
- 500,000; 3% of Chile's population

Regions with significant populations
- Punta Arenas, Santiago, Antofagasta, Iquique

Languages
- Chilean Spanish, Croatian

Religion
- Christianity, mainly Roman Catholic others

Related ethnic groups
- Croatians

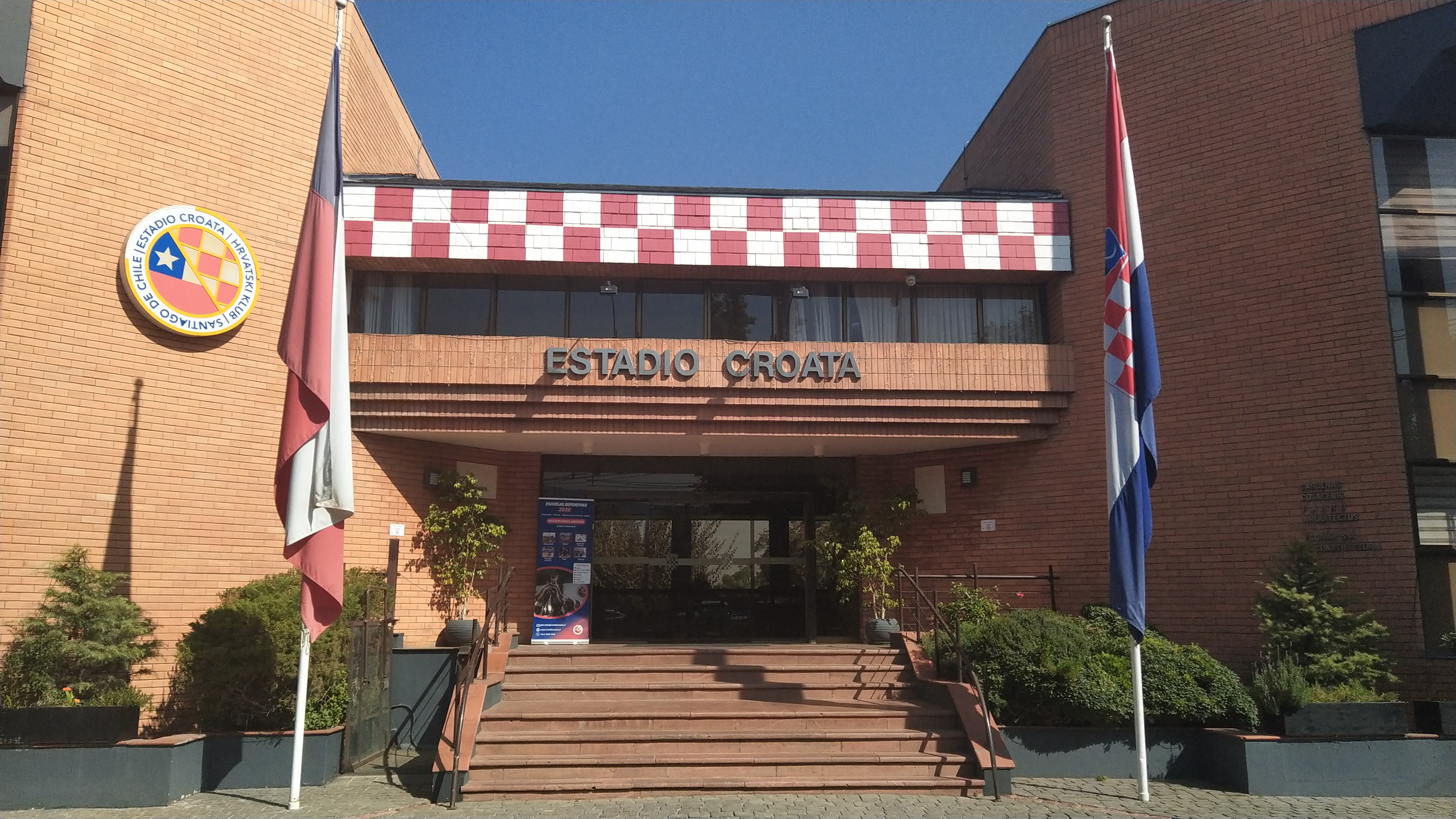
Estadio Croata, the biggest Croatian organization in Chile

Croatian Chileans (Spanish: Chileno-croatas, pronounced [tʃiˈleno kɾoˈata]; Croatian: čileanski Hrvati or Hrvatski Čileanci) are Chileans of full or partial Croatian descent. Chile has one of the largest communities of ethnic Croats outside Europe, second only to Croatian Americans. They are one of the main examples of successful assimilation of a non-Spanish-speaking European ethnic group into Chilean society. Many successful entrepreneurs, scientists and artists, as well as prominent politicians who have held some of the highest offices in the country, have been of Croatian descent – including the 37th president, Gabriel Boric.

== History ==
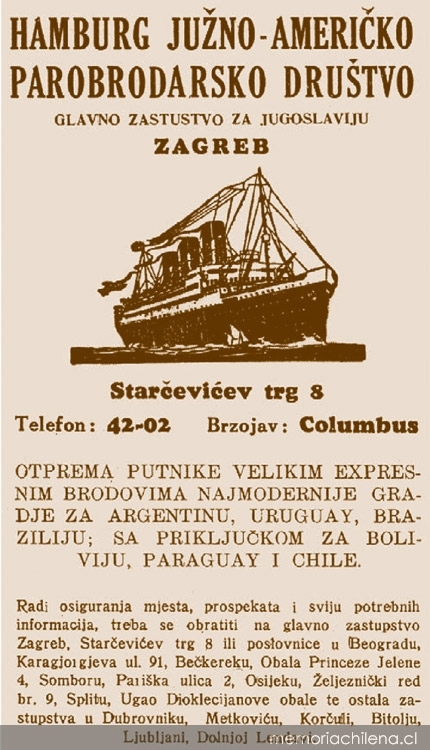
Early 20th century ad-poster of Croatian ship ready to travel to South America.

The oppression of the Croatian people and the denial of an internationally recognised nation was the principal factor leading them to embark on a constant migration to Chile. At first they were recognised and officially registered as former citizens of the countries or empires from which they had fled. Until 1915 they were recognised as Austrians, and afterwards up until 1990 as Yugoslavians. Since 1990, and in accordance to the establishment of the newly internationally recognised Republic of Croatia, Chilean Croats have reasserted their cultural and ethnic identity.

The Croatian community first established itself in two provinces situated at the extreme ends of Chile: Antofagasta, in the Atacama desert of the north and Punta Arenas in the Patagonian region in the south. The large arrival of Croats in Chile began in 1864 and the migration grew steadily until 1956 – reaching several more than 6,000. In the early part of this 1864–1956 era more Croats settled in Argentina than in Chile. For example, in Argentina, the number reached 80,000, but only about 57% of Croats remained in Argentina. Some returned to Europe or moved and settled in Chile where Croats had a more rapid and successful assimilation, which led to a significant increase in the Chilean-Croat population in periods when there was no migration of Croats from Europe to the Americas.

It is estimated that there are up to 380,000 Chileans of Croatian descent. Some sources even increase the number to 400,000 descendants. Included in the Croatian population are Italian and Istro-Romanian minorities, the latter speak a Romance language relates to Italian; they too easily assimilated to the Chilean society because of related Latin culture.

== Dalmatian-Croatian in Chile ==
The first issue of the publication Sloboda was published in March 1902, in Antofagasta. It was the first newspaper of the Croatian immigrants in Latin America. The Croatian immigrants in Chile conducted extensive journalistic work since 1902, which includes more than 50 newspapers, publications and newsletters.

The Dalmatian coast, with thousands of islands of white rock, covered with vineyards, pine forests and olive trees, is similar to the geographical features of Chile. Most families have a relative or descendant in Chile. Chile's name, unlike other parts of the world where it is almost unknown, is loved and admired by many Dalmatians as a second home.

== Croatians in Punta Arenas ==
Punta Arenas is the most prominent settlement on the Strait of Magellan and the capital of the Magallanes y la Antártica Chilena Region, Chile. It has a population of over 146,000 inhabitants (2008). The city has its roots among the population origin of the European colonists (Croatian and Spanish) that populated the area in the mid-nineteenth century. There are also descendants of people from other countries (i.e. German, English, Italian, Swiss and others).

Croatian immigration in Punta Arenas was a crucial development in the region of Magallanes and the city in particular. Currently, it is possible to see this influence in the names of shops and many buildings.

== Croatian Chileans ==
=== Political figures ===
- Tamara Agnic – business administrator, Superintendent of pensions (2014–2016)
- Ingrid Antonijevic – economist, Chilean minister (2002–2006)
- Vicente Merino Bielich – Naval officer, Chilean minister (1946), Vice President of Chile (1946)
- Gabriel Boric – deputy (2014–2022), President of Chile (2022–2026)
- Hernán Büchi Buc – economist, Chilean Minister (1983–1984 / 1985–1989)
- Romy Schmidt Crnosija – lawyer, Chilean minister (2006–2010)
- Igor Garafulic – economist, Intendant of Santiago Metropolitan Region (2008–2010)
- Carolina Goić Borojević – social worker, deputy (2006–2014), Senator (2014–2022)
- Alejandro Jadresic Marinovic – industrial engineer, Chilean minister (1994–1998)
- Alejandro Kusanovic Glusevic – mechanical civil engineer, Senator (2022–2030)
- Carlos González Jaksic – teacher, Regidor (1963–1969) and Alcalde of Punta Arenas (1964–1967 / 1992–1996), deputy (1969–1973)
- Cedomil Lausic Glasinovic – agronomist, MIR activist
- Yerko Ljubetic – lawyer, Chilean minister (2005–2006)
- Miodrag Marinović – businessman, deputy (2010–2014)
- Vlado Mirosevic – political scientist, deputy (since 2014)
- Baldo Prokurica – lawyer, deputy (1990–2002), Senator (2002–2018), Chilean minister (2018–2020 / 2020–2022)
- Claudio Radonich – lawyer, Intendant of Magallanes Region (2013–2014), Alcalde of Punta Arenas (since 2016)
- Sacha Razmilic – business administrator, Alcalde of Antofagasta (since 2024)
- Esteban Tomic – lawyer, Ambassador to the OAS (2000–2006)
- Radomiro Tomic – lawyer, deputy (1941–1949), Senator (1950–1953 / 1961–1965), Ambassador to the United States (1965–1968)
- Tomás Vodanovic – sociologist, Alcalde of Maipú (since 2021)
- Pedro Vuskovic – economist, Chilean minister (1970–1972)
- Edmundo Pérez Zujovic – businessman, Chilean minister (1965–1967 / 1968–1969)

=== Academics and scientists ===
- Francisco Bozinovic Kuscevic – biologist, National Prize for Natural Sciences (2020)
- Lily Garafulic Yankovic – sculptor, professor of fine arts
- Cedomil Goic – literary critic and professor of literature at Pontifical Catholic University of Chile
- Eric Goles – mathematician and author, National Prize for Exact Sciences (1993)
- Alfredo Jadresic – professor of medicine (also Olympic high jumper)
- Ernesto Livacic Gazzano – academic, author
- Ernesto Livacic Rojas – academic, economist
- Mateo Martinić Beroš – academic, Chilean National History Award (2000), founder of Institute of Patagonia
- Luis Advis Vitaglich – philosophy academic, composer of Santa María de Iquique
- Jorge Yutronic – academic, electrical engineer

=== Writers ===
- Lenka Franulic – journalist, author, the annual Lenka Fraunlic Award for the best journalist of the year was named in her honour
- Astrid Fugellie Gezan – poet
- José Goles Radnić – music writer and composer
- Eugenio Mimica Barassi – author
- Andrés Morales Milohnic – poet, author, academic, Prize Pablo Neruda 2001
- Cristián Contreras Radovic – journalist, author, speaker, Doctor of Philosophy, leader of the United Centre
- Roque Esteban Scarpa – poet, author, academic
- Antonio Skármeta Vranicic – author, novelist

=== Sportspeople ===
==== Athletics ====
- Pedro Goić – track and field (hammer throw)
- Alfredo Jadresic – track and field (high jump)
- Myriam Yutronic – track and field (discus throw)

==== Auto racing ====
- Boris Garafulic Litvak – racing driver
- Boris Garafulic Stipicic – racing driver

==== Basketball ====
- Ivo Beovic – basketball player
- Pablo Coro Oyarzo – basketball player
- Pablo Coro Quitral – basketball player
- Andrés Mitrovic – basketball player
- Juan Ostoic – basketball player
- Milenko Skoknic – basketball player, also diplomat
- Edgardo Tadic – basketball player and coach

==== Football ====
- Ivo Basay Hatibovic – football manager and footballer
- Marko Biskupovic – football manager and footballer
- Yerko Darlic – footballer
- Felipe Seymour Dobud – footballer
- Peter Dragicevic – football administrator, former president of Colo-Colo
- Juan Koscina – footballer
- Benjamín Kuscevic – footballer
- José Lafrentz Marusich – footballer
- Milovan Mirošević – football manager and footballer
- Nicolás Peranic – footballer
- Nicolás Peric – footballer and sports commentator
- Leandro Delgado Plankovic – footballer and coach
- Ronnie Radonich – football manager and footballer
- Harold Mayne-Nicholls Sekul – football administrator, former president of ANFP and FIFA official
- Jaime Lo Presti Travanic – footballer
- Luka Tudor Bakulic – footballer and sports commentator

==== Rugby union ====
- Matías Garafulic – rugby union player
- Nicolás Garafulic – rugby union player
- Anton Petrowitsch – rugby union player

==== Table tennis ====
- Juan Papic – table tennis player
- Sofija Tepes – table tennis player

==== Other ====
- Dusan Bonacic – volleyball player
- Romina Bonacic – field hockey player
- Slavko Dekovic – swimmer
- Neven Ilic – sports official, member of the International Olympic Committee
- Vladimiro Mimica – sports radio personality, also Alcalde of Punta Arenas (2008–2012)
- Iván Morovic – Chess International Grandmaster
- Alejandro Peric – Director of Chile Classic PGA Web.com Tour
- Johnnathan Tafra – canoeist

=== Media personalities ===
- Cristián Arriagada Bižaca – actor
- Jéssica Eterovic – model
- Carolina Fadic – actress
- Alejandro Goic – actor
- Carolina Mestrovic – singer, model
- Julio Milostich – actor
- Paulina Mladinic – model
- Isidora Cabezón Papic – actress
- Martín Cárcamo Papic – television presenter
- Pedro Pavlovic – journalist
- Santiago Pavlovic – journalist
- Mauricio Pesutic – actor
- Simón Pesutic – actor
- Ángela Contreras Radovic – actress
- Manuela Martelli Salamovich – actress
- Tonka Tomicic Petric – television presenter, model
- Antonio Vodanovic – television presenter
- Sergio Vodanović – screenwriter, journalist, dramatist, lawyer
- Carolina Arregui Vuskovic – actress

=== Business people ===
- Pascual Baburizza Šoletić
- Andrónico Luksic Abaroa
- Andrónico Luksic Craig
- Guillermo Luksic Craig
- Jean-Paul Luksic Fontbona

=== Other notable Chilean croats ===
- Alejandro Goic Karmelic – clergyman
- Leonor Oyarzún Ivanovic – First Lady of Chile
- Antonio Rendić Ivanović – doctor, a.k.a. "Ivo Serge" as poet
- Koko Stambuk – Chilean musician

== See also ==
- Chile–Croatia relations
- Croatian Argentines
- Croatian Brazilian
- Croatian Peruvian
