= Iris Fontbona =

Chilean businesswoman

- Born: Iris Balbina Fontbona González; 1942 or 1943 (age 83–84)
- Citizenship: Chile
- Known for: Mining businesswoman and media proprietor
- Spouse: Andrónico Luksic Abaroa (deceased)
- Children: 3, including Jean-Paul Luksic Fontbona

Iris Balbina Fontbona González (born 1942/1943) is a Chilean mining magnate, media proprietor, billionaire businesswoman, and the widow of Andrónico Luksic Abaroa, from whom she inherited Antofagasta PLC.

As of February 2025, Forbes estimated her net worth at US$25.8 billion. She is the wealthiest person in Chile, the fourth wealthiest in Latin America, and the ninth wealthiest woman worldwide in 2022 according to Forbes.

== Fortune ==
Fontbona acquired her wealth following the death of her husband, Andrónico Luksic Abaroa, in 2005 from cancer.

The bulk of her husband's business went to their three sons, Guillermo, Jean Paul and Andrónico. Jean Paul manages Antofagasta, Luksic Group's copper mining group and one of the largest mining companies in the world.

== Business ==
Fontbona and her family control Antofagasta, the Santiago-based mining company. Through the publicly traded company Quiñenco, they control Banco de Chile, Madeco, a copper products manufacturer, the country's largest brewer, CCU, and a shipping company, CSAV. CSAV is the world's 16th largest shipping company as measured by TEUs. In 2013, she controlled 65% of Antofagasta.

Following the death of her husband, business of her husband under her control, "Fontbona managed to make their family business grow and reach its new heights of success."

This included turning the business in the second biggest bank in Chile, the biggest brewer in the world, manager of the largest copper mines in the world and controlling the world's largest shipping company. Another one of her businesses is a pair of luxury hotel chains and a luxury resort in Croatia. One of her first major actions following her husband's death was to acquire a 70% stake in Chilean television station, Canal 13. Much of her power in the company appears to be indirect. Major business decisions impacting the company largely run by her son, Andrónico Luksic Craig, need to be approved of by Fontbona.

== Philanthropy ==
In 2015, Fontbona donated a record CL$3.1 billion (approximately US$3.9 million) to the annual Chilean Telethon, which seeks to help children with physical disabilities. She appeared on television for a telethon, which also takes place before a live audience.

In 2016, she donated CL$4.4 billion (approximately US$5.5 million), which assisted in setting a record for the charity event in terms of funds raised.

== Background ==
Fontbona was born in 1942 and attended a Catholic high school. When she was 17 she met Andrónico Luksic Abaroa, who was 15 years older than her, and who married him by the time she was 20. Luksic had five children by his first wife, Patricia Lederer, who died before he did. Fontbona became the step-mother of Andrónico Luksic Craig when he was a 7-year-old. Another of her sons was Guillermo Luksic, who died of lung cancer in 2013. The couple had three children of their own.

She is a devout Roman Catholic. She keeps a low profile but garners much media attention annually during the Chilean Telethon. She has never given an interview with the media.
