= Fontbona =

Fontbona is a surname. Notable people with the surname include:

- Francesc Fontbona (born 1948), Catalan art historian
- Iris Fontbona (born 1944), Chilean billionaire businesswoman
- Jean-Paul Luksic Fontbona (fl. early 21st century), Chilean heir and businessman
