= Andrónico Luksic =

Andrónico Luksic may refer to:

- Andrónico Luksic Abaroa (1926–2005), founder of the Luksic Group
- Andrónico Luksic Craig (born 1954), son of Andrónico Luksic Abaroa and chairman of Quiñenco
