= Andrónico Luksic Craig =

Chilean businessman

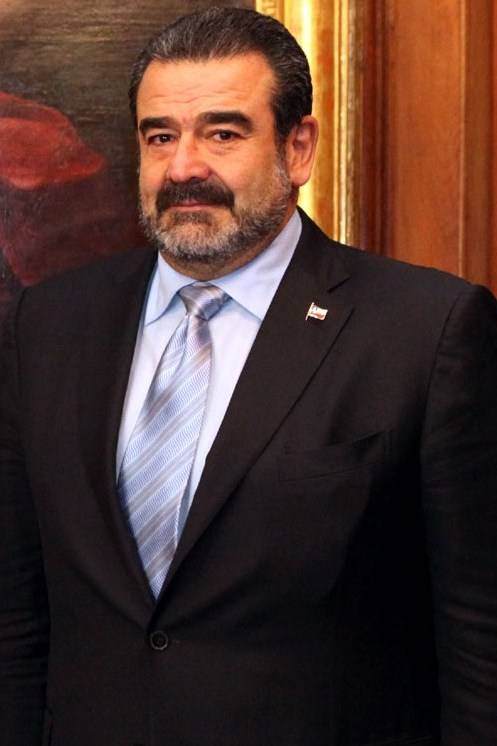
- Born: Andrónico Mariano Luksic Craig; April 16, 1954 (age 72); Antofagasta, Chile
- Education: Babson College
- Occupation: Chairman
- Children: 5
- Parent(s): Andrónico Luksic; Ena Craig
- Relatives: Guillermo Luksic Craig (brother); Jean-Paul Luksic Fontbona (half-brother)

Andrónico Mariano Luksic Craig (born 16 April 1954) is a Chilean businessman and the chairman of Quiñenco, a subsidiary of the Luksic Group, one of Chile's largest conglomerates. He is the wealthiest individual in Chile according to Forbes.

== Biography ==
Andrónico Luksic Craig, the eldest son of Andrónico Luksic and Ena Craig, spent his early childhood years alongside his younger brother Guillermo in the mineral deserts of northern Chile. When Luksic was just four years old, his mother died during a heart operation. Fourteen years later, his father married Iris Fontbona, and together they had three children: María Paola, María Gabriela, and Jean-Paul.

In 1960, the Luksic family relocated to Santiago. Luksic attended The Grange School before moving to the United States at the age of 16 to attend the Dublin School for Boys in New Hampshire. After graduating from high school, he relocated to Boston to study business at Babson College. However, his time at Babson was brief as he returned to South America to work at the family's Ford dealerships.

During this time, he married Patricia Lederer Tcherniak, an Argentine national born around 1958, and together they had five children: Andrónico (b. 1981), Davor, Dax, Maximiliano, and Fernanda. The couple divorced in 2016.

At the age of fifty, Luksic climbed Mount Everest in May 2004, despite having no prior experience in mountaineering. Subsequently, in 2005, he accomplished the "Seven Summits of the World" by reaching the highest peak on each of the seven continents of the world.

== Business career ==
Following the death of his brother Guillermo in 2013, Luksic assumed the role of Chairman of the Luksic Group and several of its associated companies, including Quinenco S.A., which manages the family's non-mining investments. Under his leadership, the group has focused on consolidation and strengthening its position through new acquisitions.

In addition to serving as the Chairman of Quiñenco, Luksic is also the Chairman of Compañía Cervecerías Unidas S.A. (CCU) and its subsidiaries, CCU Chile, CCU Argentina, and ECUSA. He serves as the Vice Chairman of Compañía Sud Americana de Vapores S.A. (CSAV) and Banco de Chile, and as a member of the board of directors of Madeco S.A. (renamed Invexans) and Sociedad de Fomento Fabril (SOFOFA). He is a member of the International Advisory Council of Barrick Gold, the Brookings Institution, the Panama Canal Authority, and the Chairman's International Council of the Council of the Americas. Additionally, Luksic is a board member of the Chilean Pacific Foundation and a member of the Latin American Council of Nature Conservacy.

Luksic was appointed Chairman of Quiñenco's Board in April 2013. He also serves on the Boards of the mining companies Antofagasta PLC and Antofagasta Minerals, both of which are part of the Luksic Group.

In June, Luksic, along with Rodrigo Hinzpeter and other Quiñenco executives, sparked controversy by visiting Horacio Cartes, a former President of Paraguay classified as "significantly corrupt" by the United States, on a private jet.

The Luksic family is the wealthiest in Chile, with a net worth of $10.8 billion in 2020. According to the Forbes Billionaire List of November 2022, the family's net worth has increased to $22.8 billion, despite the challenges posed by the COVID pandemic, making them the 83rd richest family in the world.

== Awards and distinctions ==
In 2007 Luksic graduated as officer of reserve of the Army in Chile, together with other 16 professionals and businessmen.

In 2010, he was reelected as one of the three representatives of the APEC Business Advisory Council (ABAC).

In 2011, Luksic was awarded with Gold Medal of the Americas Society for his involvement in the education field (promotion of education, debate and dialogue in the whole America). He is the first and only Chilean businessman who has received this high distinction.

In 2013, Luksic was awarded business leader with best reputation in the "Merco Chile 2013", a corporate reputation rating published by El Mercurio, for his role as Vice-Chairman of Banco de Chile.

He is a member of the International Advisory Board at the Blavatnik School of Government, University of Oxford.

He is a member of the International Business Leaders Advisory Council of the Shanghai municipality, and served as a member of the APEC Business Advisory Council (ABAC) for 15 years. He is also a member of the International Advisory Board of Barrick Gold, the International Advisory Council of the Brookings Institution, and the Panama Canal Advisory Board, as well as the Chairman’s International Advisory Council of the Council of the Americas. Finally, he is a founding member of the Harvard Global Advisory Council, the Columbia University Global Leadership Council, and the Fudan University School of Management IAB. He is also a Trustee Emeritus at Babson College, and a member of the Tsinghua University School of Economics and Management.
