= United Independents (Chile) =

United Independents Independientes Unidos
- Abbreviation: IU
- Leader: Cristián Contreras Radovic; René Rubeska
- Founded: 19 August 2021
- Dissolved: 3 February 2022
- Headquarters: Santiago de Chile
- Ideology: Populism
- Political position: Right-wing to far-right self-declared: Centre
- Coalition members: United Centre; National Citizen Party
- Colours: Navy blue Blue; Red
- Chamber of Deputies: 1 / 155
- Senate: 0 / 43
- Councillors: 1 / 2,240

United Independents (Spanish: Independientes Unidos, IU) was a Chilean electoral pact that grouped together the United Centre, National Citizen Party and independent parties for the 2021 parliamentary and regional councilor elections.

== History ==
The coalition was officially registered with the Electoral Service (Servel) on August 19, 2021. One of its leaders is the academic and television panelist Cristián Contreras Radovic, who seeks to run as a presidential candidate for the November 2021 election as a representative of United Centre.

Initially, some media reported the alleged inclusion of National Force, an openly Pinochetist organization that is in formation as a political party, and which is headed by former deputy Hermógenes Pérez de Arce and lawyer Raúl Meza. Later, Contreras himself denied that the group was part of the pact, accusing the media that had spread said inclusion of spreading false information, and demanding its rectification.

IU has an authority in the country, which corresponds to a councilor from the Villarrica commune who is active in the National Citizen Party.

It will seek to present 10 candidates for senators, 85 for deputies and 79 for regional councilors.

== Composition ==
It is made up of the United Centre and the National Citizen Party, parties registered in various areas of the country. The leaders of the parties that make up the coalition at the time of formation are:

Party	Abbr.	Leader
United Centre; Centro Unido	CU	Cristián Contreras Radovic
National Citizen Party; Partido Nacional Ciudadano	PNC	René Rubeska
