= Guillermo Luksic Craig =

Chilean heir and businessman

Guillermo Luksic Craig (1956–2013) was a Chilean heir and businessman.

== Biography ==
=== Early life ===
His late father was Andrónico Luksic (1926–2005), founder of Luksic Group, including Antofagasta PLC, Minera Los Pelambres, Minera Michilla and Minera El Tesoro, and his mother is Ena Craig. He was an heir to the wealthiest family in Chile, worth an estimated US$17.4 billion as of March 2013. His brother Jean-Paul Luksic Fontbona is chairman of Antofagasta PLC.

=== Career ===
He served as chairman of CSAV, a shipping company, Compañía de las Cervecerías Unidas, a beverage company, Quiñenco. He served on the Board of Directors of Banco de Chile, and Madeco.

He was a member of the Board of Trustees of the think tank Centro de Estudios Públicos and Finis Terrae University.
