= Amores de mercado (Chilean TV series) =

- Also known as: Market Lovers
- Genre: Comedy drama
- Created by: Fernando Aragón; Arnaldo Madrid
- Written by: Alejandro Cabrera; Arnaldo Madrid; René Arcos; Marcelo Leonart
- Directed by: María Eugenia Rencoret; Víctor Huerta; Enrique Bravo
- Creative director: Carlos Lepe
- Starring: Álvaro Rudolphy; Ángela Contreras; Luciano Cruz-Coke; Alejandra Fosalba
- Opening theme: "Caradura" by Duque y Bandaduke
- Country of origin: Chile
- Original language: Spanish
- No. of episodes: 105

Production
- Executive producer: Pablo Avila
- Producer: Vania Portilla
- Production locations: Santiago, Chile
- Cinematography: Roberto Osorio; Luis Muñoz
- Editors: Jaime Pagani; Miguel Garrido
- Camera setup: Miguel Carrizo; Jaime Nuñez; Sergio Aguayo; Luis Chahuan; Jose Luis Nauto; Rafael Obregon
- Running time: 50-60 minutes
- Production company: Televisión Nacional de Chile

Original release
- Network: TVN; TV Chile
- Release: August 6 – December 28, 2001

Related
- Amor Descarado (2004); Hey...Yehii To Haii Woh! (2004); Mia stigmi duo zoes (2007); Mi gemela es hija única (2008) ¿Quién es quién? (2015); Como tú no hay 2 (2020); Nuevo amores de mercado (2024)

Amores de mercado (lit: Market Lovers) is a Chilean television series created by Fernando Aragón and Arnaldo Madrid, that aired on TVN and TV Chile from August 6, to December 28, 2001, starring Álvaro Rudolphy, Ángela Contreras, Luciano Cruz-Coke, and Alejandra Fosalba.

== Plot ==
Pedro Solis (Álvaro Rudolphy) is a young lower-middle class waiter, known as Pelluco by his family and friends. One day he finds a man, Rodolfo Ruttenmeyer, identical to him. Without finding an explanation for the strange fact, Pelluco assumes the identity of Rodolfo, as he had an accident and lost his memory. Rodolfo is received and cared by Pelluco's family, who believes he is actually Pelluco. Pelluco, in the other hand, tries to find the answer to what he saw that day, while living as a businessman. He falls in love with Fernanda (Ángela Contreras), the lover of his stepbrother Ignacio (Luciano Cruz-Coke). Fernanda cheats on Pelluco with his stepbrother, but when she discovers the new personality of her husband, she begins to feel a real affection for him. Ignacio, jealous of the success of Pelluco, searches for a way to humiliate him and take over his job as manager. Rodolfo, who remembers nothing, takes the place of Pelluco working at the Central Market of Santiago, where Pelluco used to work. Rodolfo's personality is totally different from Pelluco, who is more outgoing. Indeed, he learns that Betzabé (Alejandra Fosalba), a girl from Pelluco's neighborhood, is pregnant, and she believes that Rodolfo is the father of her child.

Pelluco and Rodolfo are actually twins, but Rodolfo was sold to a wealthy family because financial problems did not allow his family to keep both children. Maitén (Loreto Valenzuela) and "Chingao" (Mauricio Pesutic), parents of the twins, move to Santiago without knowing that their son Rodolfo is also in the city. Chingao is taken to prison for illegal business, but returns home when Rodolfo arrives.

After many adventures and misunderstandings, the twins discover what had happened. Camilo Ruttenmeyer (Jaime Vadell), the company's owner, discovers Ignacio's plans to steal his money. While quarreling Ignacio menaces Rodolfo with a gun, he fires but accidentally the bullet hits Pelluco, who dies in hospital in the final episode.

== Cast ==
=== Main characters ===
- Álvaro Rudolphy as Pedro Solís García (Pelluco) / Rodolfo Ruttenmeyer Echeverria
- Ángela Contreras as Fernanda Lira.
- Luciano Cruz-Coke as Ignacio Valdés Atal.
- Alejandra Fosalba as Betsabé Galdames.

=== Supporting characters ===
- Jaime Vadell as Camilo Ruttenmeyer.
- Coca Guazzini as Morgana Atal.
- Mauricio Pesutic as Nicasio (Chingao) Solís.
- Loreto Valenzuela as Maitén García.
- Gabriela Hernández as Nora Pacheco.
- Ana Reeves as Alicia Rubilar (Pastora).
- Marcelo Romo as Horacio Galdames.
- Catalina Guerra as Antonia Altamira.
- Claudio Arredondo as Basilio Concha.
- Edgardo Bruna as Manfred Midesraub (Clinton).
- Malucha Pinto as Mónica Peralta.
- Iñigo Urrutia as Esaú Galdames.
- Sigrid Alegría as Shakira Rebolledo
- Francisco Pérez-Bannen as Jonathan Muñoz.
- Patricia López as Jessenia Solís García (Jessi).
- Felipe Braun as Rubén Cancino.
- Mariana Loyola as Topacio Peralta.
- Nicolás Saavedra as Homero Silva.
- Carmina Riego as Esmeralda Peralta.
- Felipe Castro as Dino Buzzatti.
- Paola Volpato as Vicky Tapia.
- Luis Gnecco as Bernardo Torres.
- Marcela Espinoza as Constanza Valdés Atal (Cony).
- Catalina Pulido as Chantal Müller.
- Paola Giannini as Myriam Astudillo.
- Andrés Velasco as The Blond.
- Mireya Moreno as Corina Ahumada.
- Ricardo Pinto as Blind Ahumada.
- Luis Uribe as Rosario Lopetegui.
- Francisca Tapia as Paula.
- Sebastián de la Cuesta as Mancilla.
- Maité Fernández as Carmelita.
- Jael Unger as Mrs. Amelia.

== Remakes ==
- Amor Descarado (2004).
- Hey...Yehii To Haii Woh! (2004).
- Mia stigmi duo zoes (2007).
- Pauwen en reigers (2008).
- Mi gemela es hija única (2008).
- ¿Quién es quién? (2015).
- Como tú no hay 2 (2020).
- Nuevo amores de mercado (2024).
