= National Citizen Party (Chile) =

National Citizen Party Partido Nacional Ciudadano
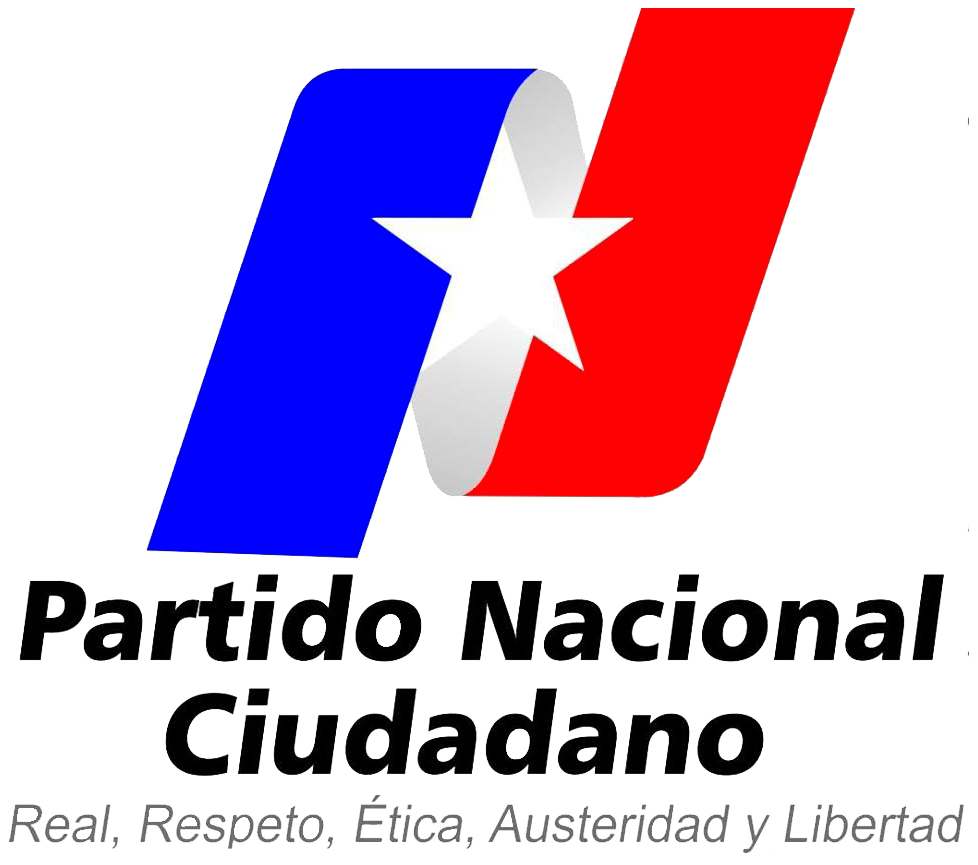
- President: René Rubeska
- Secretary: Miguel Ángel Arteaga
- Founded: 17 May 2019
- Legalised: 13 April 2020
- Dissolved: 3 February 2022
- Split from: RN
- Headquarters: Pedro de Valdivia 457, Villarrica, Chile
- Ideology: National conservatism Right-wing populism Catholic fundamentalism
- Political position: Far-right
- National affiliation: United Independents
- Colors: Blue, White and Red
- Chamber of Deputies: 0 / 120
- Senate: 0 / 38

Website
- partidonacionalciudadano.cl/ at the Wayback Machine (archived April 9, 2024)

National Citizen Party (Spanish: Partido Nacional Ciudadano, PNC) was a far-right Chilean political party. It was founded in the La Araucanía Region during 2019 by former National Renewal militants.

The political party was legalized in April 2020. The party was dissolved in February 2022 because it did not receive at least 5% of the votes in the 2021 parliamentary elections to maintain its legality.

== Electoral history ==
=== Congress election ===
Election year	Chamber of Deputies			Senate			Status
Election year	# Votes	% Votes	Seats	# Votes	% Votes	Seats	Status
2021			0 / 155	7,174	0.15%	0 / 50	Extra-parliamentary
