= Nuevo amores de mercado =

- Genre: Telenovela
- Based on: Amores de mercado by Fernando Aragón & Arnaldo Madrid
- Developed by: Alejandro Cabrera; Larissa Contreras
- Directed by: Nicolás Alemparte Bickell
- Starring: Pedro Campos; Francisca Walker; Fernanda Salazar
- Country of origin: Chile
- Original language: Spanish
- No. of seasons: 1
- No. of episodes: 144

Production
- Executive producers: Daniela Demicheli; Pablo Ávila
- Producer: Shigri Sánchez
- Camera setup: Multi-camera
- Production company: Mazal Producciones

Original release
- Network: Mega
- Release: November 25, 2024 – July 30, 2025

Nuevo amores de mercado is a Chilean telenovela based on the 2001 telenovela Amores de mercado, created by Fernando Aragón and Arnaldo Madrid. It aired on Mega from November 25, 2024 to July 30, 2025. The telenovela stars Pedro Campos, Francisca Walker and Fernanda Salazar.

== Cast ==
- Pedro Campos Di Girolamo as Pedro "Pelluco" Solís / Rodolfo Ruttenmeyer
- Francisca Walker as Fernanda Lira
- Simón Pešutić as Ignacio Valdés
- Fernanda Salazar as Betsabé Galdames
- Andrés Velasco as Nicasio "Chingao" Solís
- Amparo Noguera as Maitén García
- Francisca Imboden as Morgana Attal
- Bastián Bodenhöfer as Camilo Ruttenmeyer
- Solange Lackington as Nora Pacheco
- Claudio Arredondo as Clinton Midesraub
- Íngrid Cruz as Alicia "Pastora" Rubilar
- Josefina Montané as Chantal Müller
- Gastón Salgado as Jonathan Muñoz
- Carmen Zabala as Shakira Rebolledo
- Claudio Castellón as Basilio Concha
- Susana Hidalgo as Antonia Altamira
- Fernando Godoy as Homero Silva
- Dayana Amigo as Topacio Peralta
- Carmina Riego as Mónica Peralta
- Roberto Farías as Horacio Galdames
- Nathalia Aragonese as Victoria "Vicky" Tapia
- Francisco Medina as Mauricio "Rucio" Jiménez
- Teresita Commentz as Yesenia Solís
- Diego Boggioni as Esaú Galdames
- Andrea Eltit as Esmeralda Peralta
- Christian Zúñiga as Bernardo Torres
- Manuel Castro Volpato as Dino Buzzati
- Natalia Reddersen as Myriam Astudillo
- Rafael de la Reguera as Rosario Lopetegui

== Production ==
In March 2024, a report in El Mostrador revealed that Televisión Nacional de Chile licensed the rights to three of its most successful telenovelas of recent times to Mega, including Amores de mercado, for an amount close to US$200,000 each title over a period of eight years to produce remakes. The purchase of the scripts generated criticism on social media and diverse opinions from multiple personalities against Televisión Nacional for selling its assets. Filming began on 9 September 2024.

== Reception ==
=== Ratings ===
Season	Episodes	First aired		Last aired	
Season	Episodes	Date	Rating (in points)	Date	Rating (millions)
1	144	November 25, 2024	17.1	July 30, 2025	1.30

=== Awards and nominations ===
Year	Award	Category	Nominated	Result	Ref
2025	Produ Awards	Best Romantic Telenovela	Nuevo amores de mercado	Nominated	
2025	Produ Awards	Best Lead Actress - Romantic Telenovela	Amparo Noguera	Nominated	
2025	Produ Awards	Best Lead Actor - Romantic Telenovela	Pedro Campos	Nominated	
2025	Produ Awards	Best Screenplay - Superseries or Telenovela	Alejandro Cabrera	Nominated	
