= SS Khedive Ismail =

Turbine steamship sunk during World War II

Coordinates: 01°25′N 72°22′E

History
- Name: Aconcagua (1922–35); Khedive Ismail (1935–44)
- Namesake: Aconcagua mountain (1922–35); Khedive Isma'il Pasha (1935–44)
- Owner: Compañía Sud Americana de Vapores (1922–32); William Hamilton & Co, Glasgow (1932–35); Khedivial Mail Line (1935–36); Pharaonic Mail Line SAE (1936–39); Ministry of War Transport (1940–44)
- Operator: Lowden Conner & Co, Liverpool (1932–35); British-India Steam Navigation Company (1940–44)
- Port of registry: (Chile) Valparaíso (1922–32); (United Kingdom) Liverpool (1933–34); (United Kingdom) London (1934–35); (Kingdom of Egypt) Alexandria (1935–39); (United Kingdom) London (1940–44)
- Route: Valparaíso – Panama – New York (1922–32)
- Ordered: April 1920
- Builder: Scotts Shipbuilding and Engineering Company, Greenock
- Yard number: 516
- Launched: 11 February 1922
- Completed: October 1922
- Identification: UK official number 162372; (1933–35; 1940–44); code letters HBLP (1922–33); Call sign LHWK (1933–34); call sign MKGG (1934–35); call sign SUBR (1935–39); call sign GLNL (1940–44)
- Fate: Sunk, 12 February 1944

General characteristics
- Tonnage: 7,290 GRT (1922–39); 7,513 GRT (1940–44); tonnage under deck 4991; 4,184 NRT
- Length: 422.8 ft (128.9 m)
- Beam: 56.2 ft (17.1 m)
- Draught: 28 ft 3 in (8.61 m)
- Depth: 30.4 ft (9.3 m)
- Decks: two
- Installed power: 1,469 NHP; 8,450 bhp (6,300 kW)
- Propulsion: four steam turbines; two screws
- Speed: 17 knots (31 km/h; 20 mph)
- Crew: 187 (as troop ship)
- Sensors & processing systems: direction finding equipment; echo sounding device
- Armament: DEMS (1940–44)
- Notes: sister ship: Mohamed Ali El-Kebir (formerly Teno)

SS Khedive Ismail, formerly SS Aconcagua, was a turbine steamship that was built in 1922 as an ocean liner, converted into a troop ship in 1940 and sunk by a Japanese submarine in 1944 with great loss of life. She was owned by the Chilean company CSAV 1922–1932, the Scottish William Hamilton & Co (1932–35), the Egyptian company KML 1935–1940 and the British Ministry of War Transport 1940–1944.

== Aconcagua ==
In April 1920 the Chilean Compañía Sud Americana de Vapores (CSAV) ordered a pair of passenger and cargo liners for service between Valparaíso and New York via the Panama Canal. Construction was delayed, the ships were not completed until the latter part of 1922, and CSAV lost money as a result.

The first ship was launched on 11 February 1922 and completed in August. She was named Aconcagua after the 22,837 feet (6,961 m) Aconcagua mountain, the highest in the Andes. Her sister ship, Teno, was launched on 5 September 1922, completed in December and reached Chile in January 1923.

The two ships were built by Scotts Shipbuilding and Engineering Company of Greenock on the Firth of Clyde, Scotland. Each had 18 corrugated furnaces with a combined grate area of 385 square feet (36 m^{2}) that heated six single-ended boilers with a combined heating surface of 17,832 square feet (1,657 m^{2}). These fed steam at 215 lb_{f}/in^{2} to four steam turbines that drove twin propeller shafts by single-reduction gearing. The turbines had a combined rating of 1,469 NHP and gave the ship a speed of 17 knots (31 km/h).

By the time Aconcagua and Teno entered service they faced strong competition from Grace Line, and CSAV reported losses in 1922 and 1923. However, from 1922 the Chilean government introduced protection measures for Chilean companies operating shipping services along the country's 2,300-nautical-mile (4,300 km)-long coast, and in 1923 global shipping rates stabilised.

The Wall Street crash of October 1929 started the Great Depression, which sharply reduced the export market for Chilean mining products and hence the country's ability to buy goods from overseas. CSAV lost trade, and especially on its Valparaíso – New York route, so in June 1931 the company suspended the service. It sold Aconcagua and Teno to Lithgows of Port Glasgow, and in August 1932 both ships returned to Scotland.

Teno was laid up, but Aconcagua was sold to William Hamilton and Company, run by Lord Ernest Hamilton. Lowden Conner and Company of Liverpool were appointed to manage both ships.

== Khedive Ismail ==
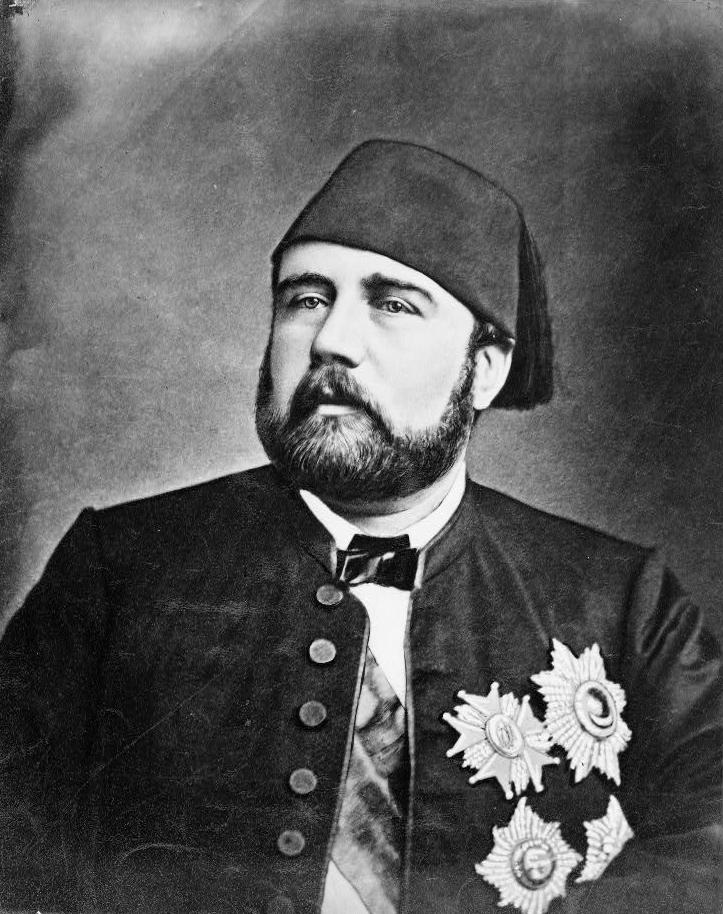
Khedive Isma'il Pasha after whom Aconcagua was renamed

In 1935 the Khedivial Mail Steamship and Graving Dock Company of Alexandria, Egypt bought both Aconcagua and Teno. The company, which traded as the Khedivial Mail Line (KML), renamed each ship after a former Khedive of Egypt. Aconcagua became Khedive Ismail, after Isma'il Pasha who reigned 1863–79. KML and operated services linking Alexandria across the Mediterranean Sea with Cyprus, Piraeus, Malta and Marseille. In 1936 the company was reconstituted as the Pharaonic Mail Line, but continued trading as the KML.

Although Egypt was formally independent, in practice the British Empire exercised control over the country. In 1940 the UK Ministry of War Transport requisitioned seven KML ships and placed Khedive Ismail and her sister ship Mohamed Ali El-Kebir, under the management of the British-India Steam Navigation Company. The two ships were converted into troop ships, which slightly increased their tonnage. Khedive Ismail's gross register tonnage (GRT) was increased from 7,290 to 7,513 tons.

Mohamed Ali El-Kebir was sunk in August 1940 on her first troop voyage, en route under Royal Navy escort from Avonmouth to Gibraltar. By then Khedive Ismail was in the Indian Ocean to bring Empire troops to Egypt. From then until April 1941 she carried troops in convoys from Bombay, Cape Town, Mombasa and Port Sudan to Suez and Port Said.

== Escape from the Argolic Gulf ==
In April 1941 Germany and Italy invaded Yugoslavia and Greece. After 10 days of fierce fighting the British Empire started to plan the evacuation of 60,000 British, Australian and New Zealand troops from Greece. Khedive Ismail was one of several troop ships that joined Convoy AG 14, which left Alexandria on 24 April and reached Greek waters two days later. She and a larger troop ship from AG 14, Koninklijke Rotterdamsche Lloyd's 11,406 GRT Slamat, were sent to evacuate troops from Nauplia in the Argolic Gulf in the eastern Peloponnese. Luftwaffe aircraft attacked the convoy en route to Nauplia, damaging Slamat and wounding several people aboard Khedive Ismail.

Two days before they arrived, the troop ship Ulster Prince had run aground blocking access to Nauplia Port, and on 25 April an air raid had turned her into a total loss. Khedive Ismail, Slamat and their Royal Navy escorts would now have to anchor in the bay, where boats would bring troops out to them from the shore. On the evening of 26 April three cruisers, four destroyers, Khedive Ismail and Slamat were in the Bay of Nauplia. The only available tenders were one landing craft, local caïques and the ships' own boats. Two cruisers and two destroyers embarked nearly 2,500 troops, but the slow rate of embarkation meant that Khedive Ismail did not get her turn and did not embark any.

At 0300 hrs the cruiser HMS Calcutta ordered all ships to sail, but Slamat disobeyed and continued embarking troops. Calcutta and Khedive Ismail sailed at 0400 hrs; Slamat followed at 0415 hrs, by which time she had embarked about 500 troops: about half her capacity. The convoy steamed south down the Argolic Gulf, until at about 0700 hrs waves of Luftwaffe aircraft attacked it: first Bf 109 fighters, then Ju 87 dive bombers and Ju 88 and Do 17 bombers. The attackers concentrated on Slamat as she was the largest ship. The cruiser HMS Orion and destroyers Hotspur and Isis, all of which were heavily laden with evacuated troops, escorted Khedive Ismail away as Slamat burned out of control and was abandoned and HMS Diamond stayed behind to rescue survivors.

A few hours later Diamond and another destroyer sent to assist her, HMS Wryneck, were sunk in another air raid. Khedive Ismail safely reached Souda Bay in Crete, where she joined Convoy GA 14 back to Alexandria. She then continued through the canal, reaching Suez on 30 April.

== Two years in the Indian Ocean ==
In May 1941 the British Empire occupied Iraq to reverse a pro-German nationalist coup d'état and reinstate King 'Abd al-Ilah, and in June and July it invaded Vichy-controlled Greater Lebanon and Syria whose airfields had refuelled Regia Aeronautica and Luftwaffe flights to northern Iraq. From July 1941 until the beginning of February 1942 Khedive Ismail continually brought British Indian Army reinforcements from India to Basra in Iraq, making seven trips from Bombay and two from Karachi.

In January 1942 British and Empire forces had occupied Italian Eritrea, so in the second half of February 1942 Khedive Ismail took 850 troops from Bombay to Massawa. For the next two years she criss-crossed the Indian Ocean in troop movements between Aden, Mombasa, Colombo, Durban, Bombay, Karachi, Tanga, Suez, Diego Suarez, Majunga, Berbera, Port Elizabeth, Cape Town, Djibouti, Tamatave and Dar es Salaam.

In September 1942 Khedive Ismail took part in Operation Streamline Jane, taking troops from Allied-occupied Diego Suarez in northern Madagascar to land at Vichy-held Majunga on the east coast of the island. She visited the island again in July 1943.

== Loss ==
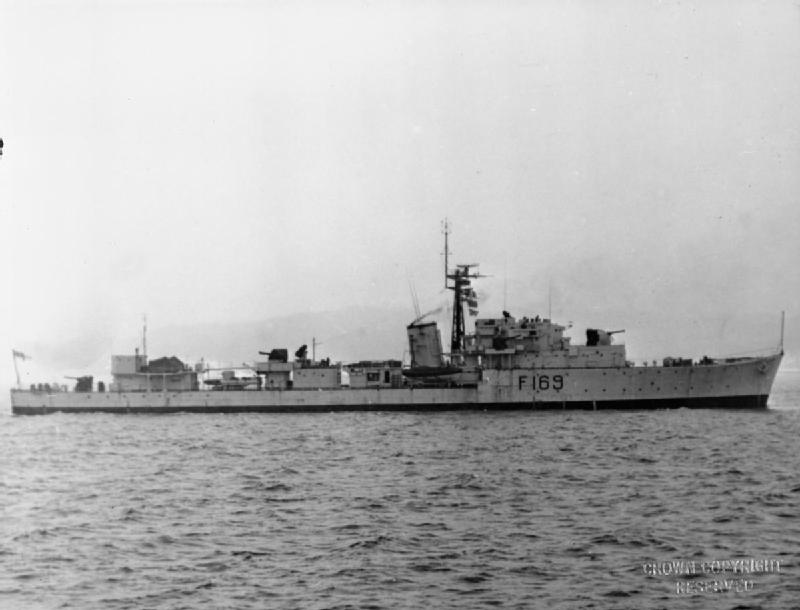
HMS Paladin rescued Khedive Ismail's survivors and shelled and tried to ram Japanese I-27

On 5 February 1944 Khedive Ismail left Mombasa bound for Colombo carrying 1,348 passengers including 996 members of the East African Artillery's 301st Field Regiment, 271 Royal Navy personnel, 19 WRNS, 53 nursing sisters and their matron, nine members of the First Aid Nursing Yeomanry and a war correspondent, Kenneth Gandar-Dower. She was part of Convoy KR 8 and it was her fifth convoy on that route. The convoy was escorted by the heavy cruiser HMS Hawkins and destroyers HMS Paladin and HMS Petard. Khedive Ismail was carrying the Convoy Commodore.

Early in the afternoon of Saturday 12 February, after a week at sea, KR 8 was in the One and a Half Degree Channel south-west of the Maldives. After lunch many of the passengers were below watching an ENSA concert, while others sunbathed on deck. At 1430 hrs the Japanese submarine I-27 had taken position off Khedive Ismail's port side to attack. A lookout sighted I-27's periscope and raised the alarm; Khedive Ismail's DEMS gunners opened fire on the submarine. At the same time I-27's commander, Cdr Toshiaki Fukumura, fired a spread of four torpedoes, two of which hit Khedive Ismail.

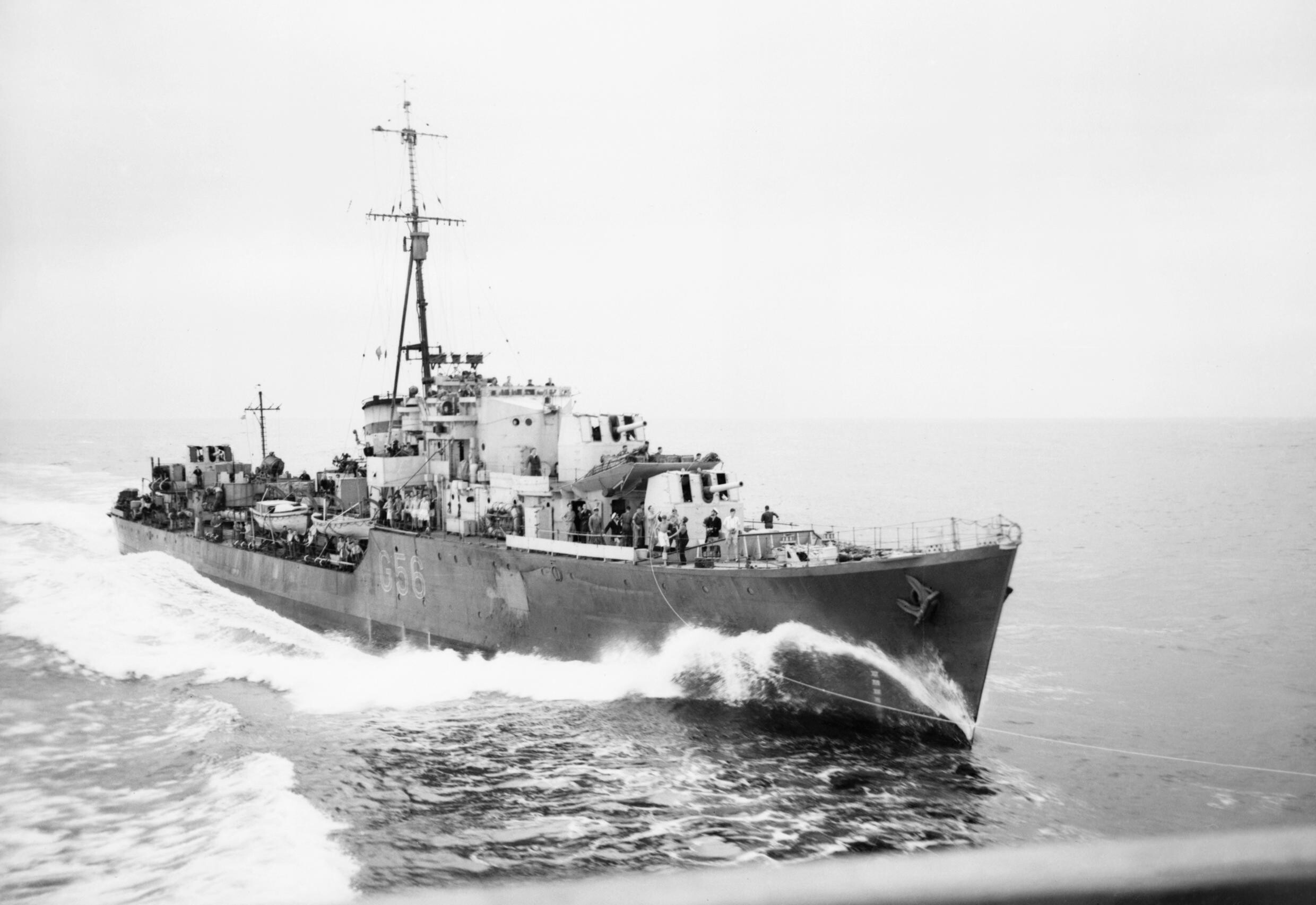
HMS Petard depth charged, shelled, torpedoed and sank I-27

The troop ship's stern was engulfed in flame and smoke and she sank in three minutes. As the convoy's merchant ships scattered for safety, Paladin lowered boats to rescue survivors and Petard released depth charges. The troop ship had sunk too quickly to launch any lifeboats, but her Carley floats floated free and some survivors were able to board them.

After three patterned releases I-27 was forced to the surface. The two destroyers engaged her with their 4-inch (100 mm) QF Mk 5 main guns and Paladin moved to ram her, but as a Type B1 submarine, she was considerably larger than the destroyer so Petard signalled Paladin to abort the manoeuvre. Paladin therefore took avoiding action but too late, and I-27's hydroplane tore a 15-foot (4.6 m) gash in Paladin's hull.

I-27 submerged again and took refuge beneath the survivors. The destruction of a submarine that might sink more ships took precedence over the lives of survivors, so with Paladin out of action Petard resumed the attack with first depth charges, then 4-inch shellfire and finally 21-inch (530 mm) Mk IX torpedoes. The depth charge fuses had to be set to detonate at the most shallow depth, and they killed or wounded many people who had survived the initial sinking. The seventh torpedo finally destroyed I-27, sinking her with all hands. The battle had lasted two and a half hours.

Approximate position in the Indian Ocean of Khedive Ismail's wreck

Of 1,511 people aboard Khedive Ismail, only 208 men and 6 women survived the sinking and subsequent battle. 1,220 men and 77 women were killed. The sinking was the third largest loss of life from Allied shipping in World War II and the largest loss of servicewomen in the history of the Commonwealth of Nations.

== Sources ==
- Crabb, Brian James (2015) [1997]. Passage to Destiny: The Story of the Tragic Loss of the SS Khedive Ismail (2nd ed.). Donington: Shaun Tyas. ISBN 978-1-907730-41-2.
- Crabb, Brian James (2006). Beyond the Call of Duty: The Loss of British Commonwealth Mercantile and Service Women at Sea During the Second World War. Donington: Shaun Tyas. ISBN 1-900289 66-0.
- de la Pedraja, Rene (1998). Oil and Coffee: Latin American Merchant Shipping from the Imperial Era to the 1950s. Westport, CT: Greenwood Publishing Group. ISBN 0-313-30839-X.
- Harnack, Edwin P. (1938) [1903]. All About Ships & Shipping (7th ed.). London: Faber and Faber.
- Talbot-Booth, E. C. (1936). Ships and the Sea (3rd ed.). London: Sampson Low, Marston & Co.
