= SS Mohamed Ali El-Kebir =

Pair of steam turbine ocean liners built in Scotland

Coordinates: 55°22′N 13°18′E

History
- Name: Teno (1922–35); Mohamed Ali El-Kebir (1935–40)
- Namesake: The city of Teno (1922–35); Khedive Muhammad Ali Pasha (1935–40)
- Owner: Compañía Sud Americana de Vapores (1922–32); Lithgows (1932–35); Khedivial Mail Line (1935–36); Pharaonic Mail Line SAE (1936–39); Ministry of War Transport (1940)
- Operator: Lowden Conner & Co, Liverpool (1932–35); British-India Steam Navigation Company (1940)
- Port of registry: (Chile) Valparaíso (1922–32); (United Kingdom) Liverpool (1933–35); (Kingdom of Egypt) Alexandria (1935–39); (United Kingdom) London (1940)
- Route: Valparaíso – Panama – New York (1922–32)
- Ordered: April 1920
- Builder: Scotts Shipbuilding and Engineering Company, Greenock
- Yard number: 517
- Launched: 5 September 1922
- Completed: December 1922
- Identification: UK official number 162373; (1933–35; 1940); code letters HBDF (1922–33); Call sign LHWP (1933–34); call sign MKCX (1934–35); call sign SUBS (1935–39); call sign GLNL (1940)
- Fate: Sunk by torpedo, 7 August 1940

General characteristics
- Tonnage: 1922–40: 7,289 GRT; 3,886 NRT; tonnage under deck 4991; 1940: 7,527 GRT; 4,122 NRT; tonnage under deck 4991
- Length: 422.8 ft (128.9 m)
- Beam: 56.2 ft (17.1 m)
- Draught: 27 ft 0 in (8.23 m)
- Depth: 30.4 ft (9.3 m)
- Decks: two
- Installed power: 1,469 NHP; 8,450 bhp
- Propulsion: four steam turbines; twin screws
- Speed: 17 knots (31 km/h)
- Crew: 187 (as troop ship)
- Sensors & processing systems: direction finding equipment; echo sounding device
- Armament: DEMS (1940)
- Notes: sister ship: Khedive Ismail; (formerly Aconcagua)

SS Mohamed Ali El-Kebir, formerly SS Teno, was one of a pair of steam turbine ocean liners built in Scotland in 1922 for the Chilean company CSAV. She and her sister ship Aconcagua ran between Valparaíso and New York via the Panama Canal until 1932, when CSAV was hit by the Great Depression and surrendered the two ships to the Scottish shipbuilder Lithgows to clear a debt.

In 1935 the Egyptian company KML bought and renamed both ships and put them on routes across the Mediterranean. Teno was renamed Mohamed Ali El-Kebir after a former Egyptian monarch. In 1940 the British government requisitioned both liners and had them converted into troop ships. Within months of being converted, Mohamed Ali El-Kebir was sunk in the Western Approaches by a German submarine. Ninety-six people were lost, but her escort, HMS Griffin, drove away the submarine and rescued 766.

== Teno ==
In April 1920 the Chilean Compañía Sud Americana de Vapores (CSAV) ordered a pair of passenger and cargo liners for service between Valparaíso and New York via the Panama Canal. Construction was delayed, the ships were not completed until the latter part of 1922, and CSAV lost money as a result.

The first ship, Aconcagua, was launched on 11 February 1922 and completed in August. Her sister ship was launched on 5 September 1922, completed in December and reached Chile in January 1923. She was to be named after the Chilean city of Boroa, but she was launched as Teno after the Chilean city of that name about 120 miles (190 km) south of Valparaíso.

The two ships were built by Scotts Shipbuilding and Engineering Company of Greenock on the Firth of Clyde, Scotland. Each had 18 corrugated furnaces with a combined grate area of 385 square feet (36 m^{2}) that heated six single-ended boilers with a combined heating surface of 17,832 square feet (1,657 m^{2}). These fed steam at 215 lb_{f}/in^{2} to four steam turbines that drove twin propeller shafts by single-reduction gearing. The turbines had a combined rating of 1,469 NHP and gave the ship a speed of 17 knots (31 km/h).

By the time Aconcagua and Teno entered service they faced strong competition from Grace Line, and CSAV reported losses in 1922 and 1923. However, from 1922 the Chilean government introduced protection measures for Chilean companies operating shipping services along the country's 2,300-nautical-mile (4,300 km)-long coast, and in 1923 global shipping rates stabilised.

The Wall Street crash of October 1929 started the Great Depression, which sharply reduced the export market for Chilean mining products and hence the country's ability to buy goods from overseas. CSAV lost trade, and especially on its Valparaíso – New York route, so in June 1931 the company suspended the service. It sold Aconcagua and Teno to Lithgows of Port Glasgow, and in August 1932 both ships returned to Scotland.

Aconcagua was sold to William Hamilton and Company, run by Lord Ernest Hamilton, but Teno was laid up at the Kyles of Bute, first at Kames, Argyll and then off Tighnabruaich. Lowden Conner and Company of Liverpool were appointed to manage both ships.

== Mohamed Ali El-Kebir ==
In 1935 the Khedivial Mail Steamship and Graving Dock Company of Alexandria, Egypt bought both Aconcagua and Teno. The company, which traded as the Khedivial Mail Line (KML), renamed each ship after a former Khedive of Egypt. Teno became Mohamed Ali El-Kebir, after Muhammad Ali Pasha who reigned 1805–48. KML and operated services linking Alexandria across the Mediterranean Sea with Cyprus, Piraeus, Malta and Marseille. In 1936 the company was reconstituted as the Pharaonic Mail Line, but continued trading as the KML.

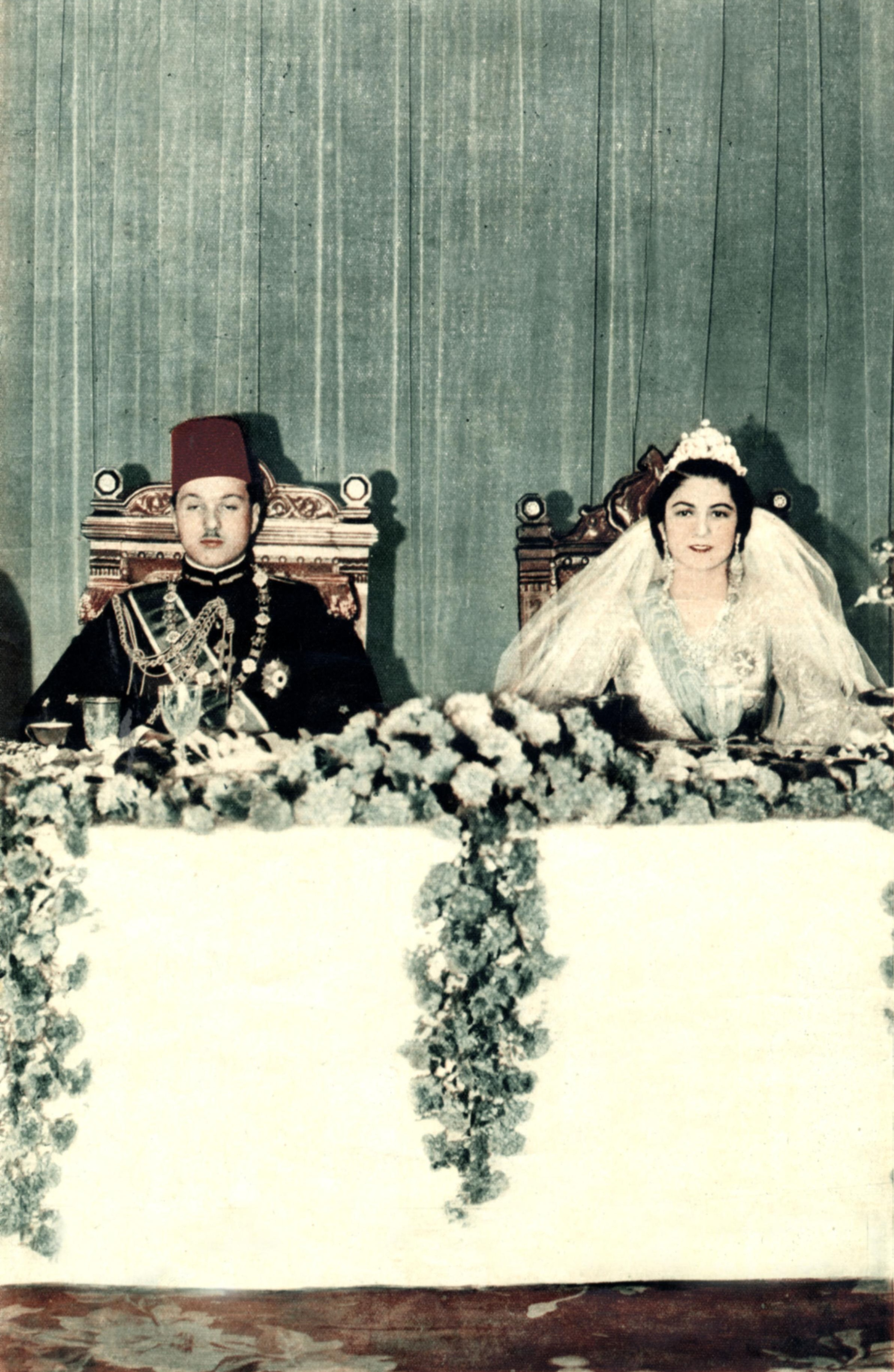
King Farouk and Queen Farida at their wedding in 1938, before their honeymoon aboard Mohamed Ali El-Kebir

In 1938 King Farouk of Egypt married his first wife, Queen Farida. They took part of their honeymoon aboard Mohamed Ali El-Kebir.

After the Second World War broke out in 1939, Mohamed Ali El-Kebir sailed to Britain. En route she called at Gibraltar where she joined Convoy HG 4, which left on 22 October and reached Liverpool on the 29th. She then returned to the Mediterranean and ran a regular service between Alexandria and Marseille until March 1940. Although Egypt was supposedly independent, in practice the British Empire controlled the country. In 1940 the UK Ministry of War Transport requisitioned seven KML ships and placed two of them, Khedive Ismail and Mohamed Ali El-Kebir, under the management of the British-India Steam Navigation Company. Initially the Admiralty used Mohamed Ali El-Kebir as a Royal Navy stores ship, but then she was converted into a troop ship, which increased her gross register tonnage and net register tonnage by more than 200 tons.

== Loss ==
In 1940 Mohamed Ali El-Kebir again left the Mediterranean for Britain. En route she joined Convoy HG 36 at Gibraltar, which left on 28 June and reached Liverpool on 8 July. At the beginning of August 1940 she was in Avonmouth, where she loaded mail and government stores and embarked 697 troops bound for the Mediterranean. There were six officers and 243 men of the 706th Construction Company, Royal Engineers, six officers and 289 men of the 15th Company, Royal Pioneer Corps, two officers and 44 ratings of the Royal Navy, 20 Royal Marines, and 97 officers and men of the Royal Artillery and the Intelligence Corps.

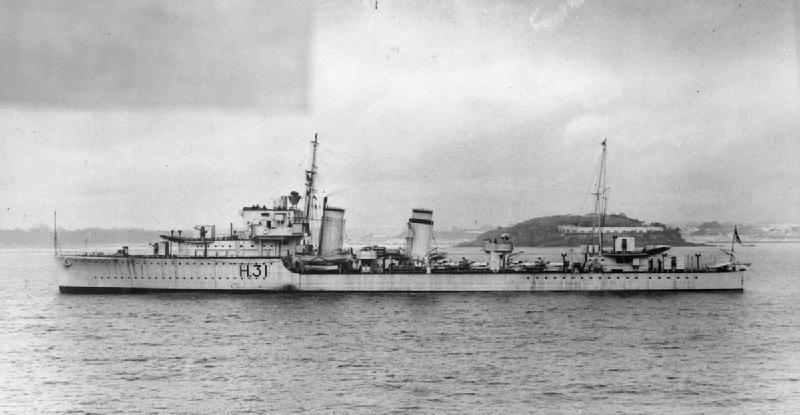
As Mohamed Ali El-Kebir sank, HMS Griffin defended her from further attack and rescued 766 survivors.

The ship left Avonmouth on 5 August, escorted by the G-class destroyer HMS Griffin. At 2140 hrs on 7 August the convoy was in the Western Approaches about 230 nautical miles (430 km) west of Bloody Foreland in Ireland, making a zigzag course at 15 knots (28 km/h) when U-38 fired two stern-launched torpedoes at her. One hit Mohamed Ali El-Kebir's starboard quarter, and she started to settle by the stern. Griffin attacked and chased away the submarine and then went to rescue survivors. Mohamed Ali El-Kebir had launched 11 lifeboats and more than 20 liferafts, and Griffin then launched her two whalers. The sea was rough, some of the lifeboats were swamped and some men were swept off the liferafts.

Mohamed Ali El-Kebir's civilian ship's doctor, Stuart Liston, and a military medical officer remained aboard to treat many wounded men and prepare them for evacuation. Her Master, John Thompson, remained aboard until after the last lifeboat was launched. He was last seen in a liferaft but did not survive. Dr Liston did not survive either. Griffin continued to release depth charges to keep U-38 away. Mohamed Ali El-Kebir sank at 2340 hrs; two hours after she was hit.

Griffin rescued 766 survivors, including 62 wounded. They were 549 troops, 154 Merchant Navy crew, 62 Royal Navy personnel and one DEMS gunner. Some men were in the water for up to seven hours before they were found, and a number died of hypothermia after being rescued. She continued to search the area for survivors until the next morning. She then took the survivors to Greenock, where she arrived on 9 August.

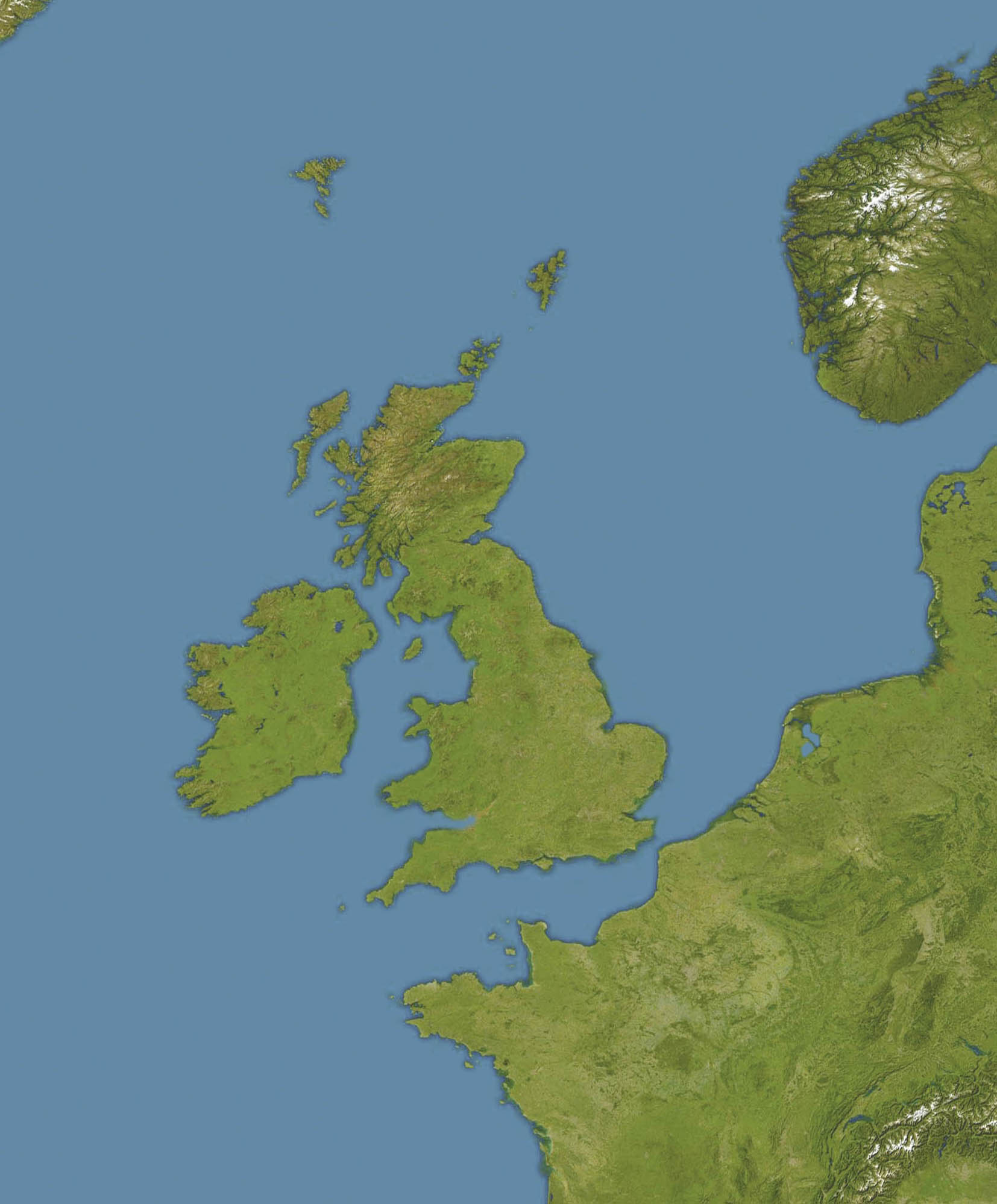
Approximate position of Mohamed Ali El-Kebir's wreck

96 men were lost: 82 troops, four Royal Navy personnel, Captain Thompson and nine Merchant Navy crew. Over the next fortnight, 33 bodies were washed ashore on the coast of County Donegal.

== Sources ==
- de la Pedraja, Rene (1998). Oil and Coffee: Latin American Merchant Shipping from the Imperial Era to the 1950s. Westport, CT: Greenwood Publishing Group. ISBN 031330839X.
- Harnack, Edwin P (1938) [1903]. All About Ships & Shipping (7th ed.). London: Faber and Faber.
- Talbot-Booth, E.C. (1936). Ships and the Sea (Third ed.). London: Sampson Low, Marston & Co. Ltd.
