= Ángela Contreras =

Chilean actress

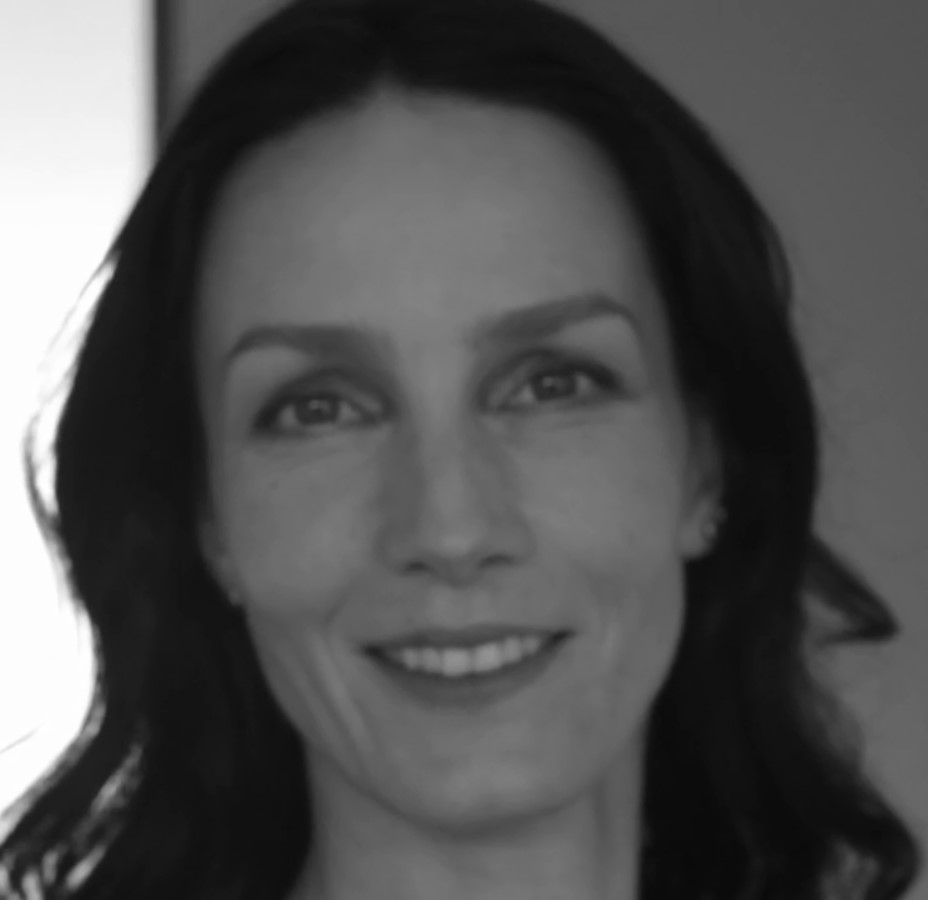
- Ángela Contreras in 2015
- Born: Ángela Felisa María Contreras Radovic; 27 May 1971 (age 54); Santiago, Chile
- Occupation: Actress
- Years active: 1993–2007
- Spouse: Roy Burns
- Relatives: Cristian Contreras (brother)

Ángela Felisa María Contreras Radovic (born 27 May 1971) is a Chilean film, theater and television actress. She is recognized for starring in several telenovelas on Televisión Nacional de Chile such as Ámame (1993), Sucupira (1996) and Amores de mercado (2001). The latter, the most watched in the history of Chilean television. She is also the sister of the Chilean politician Cristián Contreras Radovic, leader of the party United Center.

== Television ==
=== Telenovelas ===
Year	Telenovela	Character	Role	Channel
1993	Ámame	Daniela Hernández	Protagonista	TVN
1994	Rojo y miel	Claudia Bernhardt	Protagonista	TVN
1996	Sucupira	Bárbara Valdivieso	Protagonista	TVN
1999	La Fiera	Fernanda Montes	Coprotagonista	TVN
2001	Amores de mercado	Fernanda Lira	Protagonista	TVN
2002	Purasangre	Elena Santa Cruz	Coprotagonista	TVN
2003	Pecadores	Altagracia Cienfuegos	Coprotagonista	TVN
2006	Cómplices	Anne Bermúdez	Especial	TVN
2007	Amor por accidente	Isabella Darín	Protagonista	TVN
