= Rodrigo Hinzpeter =

Chilean lawyer and politician

- Hinzpeter in 2016

Minister of Defense
- In office 5 September 2012 – 11 March 2014
- President: Sebastián Pinera
- Preceded by: Andrés Allamand
- Succeeded by: Jorge Burgos

Minister of the Interior and Public Security
- In office 21 February 2011 – 5 September 2012
- President: Sebastián Pinera
- Preceded by: Creation of the Office
- Succeeded by: Andrés Chadwick

Minister of the Interior
- In office 11 March 2010 – 21 February 2011
- President: Sebastián Pinera
- Preceded by: Edmundo Pérez Yoma
- Succeeded by: Dissolution of the Office

Personal details
- Born: 27 October 1965 (age 60) Santiago, Chile
- Party: Independent (since 2014)
- Other political affiliations: National Renewal (1987–2014)
- Spouses: Joyce Ventura; Juanita Vial (2014–present)
- Children: Three
- Parent(s): María Teresa Serrano; Francisco Bulnes Ripamonti
- Relatives: Enrique Kirberg (cousin)
- Education: Pontifical Catholic University of Chile (LL.B)
- Occupation: Politician
- Profession: Lawyer

Rodrigo Javier Hinzpeter Kirberg (born 27 October 1965) is a Chilean lawyer, academic and politician of Jewish descent. Since 2014 he has served as legal manager of the business conglomerate Quiñenco.

He is one of the founders of the centre-right political party National Renewal (RN). On 11 March 2010 he was appointed Minister of the Interior by President Sebastián Piñera, and was regarded as one of his closest collaborators. In early 2011, following a legal reform that expanded the powers of the portfolio, he became the first Minister of the Interior and Public Security in Chilean history.

On 5 November 2012 he left the Interior Ministry and was appointed Minister of National Defense, being succeeded in the Interior portfolio by Andrés Chadwick. He remained in office until the end of Piñera’s presidential term in March 2014.

== Family and education ==
He is the son of Carlos Hinzpeter (born Karl Hinzpeter) and Rosa Kirberg. His father, of German-Jewish origin, left Hamburg to settle in Chile. He studied medicine at the University of Chile and worked as a physician in several hospitals in Santiago. He was also one of the founders of Clínica Las Condes. His father died in 2020 from COVID-19 during the COVID-19 pandemic. Through his mother, he is related to Enrique Kirberg, rector of the Technical State University (UTE) between 1968 and 1973, who was later detained on Dawson Island as a political prisoner.

Hinzpeter grew up in a family of German-Jewish descent on his father’s side and Ashkenazi Austrian-Jewish descent on his mother’s side, with political ties to the left. His father was a member of the Socialist Party of Chile, and his grandfather served as a city councillor in Valparaíso representing the same party. He has two siblings: Ximena, a journalist, and Daniel, an orthopedic surgeon.

He attended the Instituto Hebreo Doctor Chaim Weizmann and the Liceo A-67 Alexander Fleming, both located in eastern Santiago. He later enrolled in law at the Pontifical Catholic University of Chile, graduating as a lawyer in 1992.

He was married to journalist Joyce Ventura Nudman, whom he met during childhood, and has three sons: Raimundo, Guillermo and Ernesto.

In 2014 he began a relationship with designer Juanita Vial, daughter of lawyer and academic Víctor Vial del Río.

== Political career ==
=== Early career ===
He entered politics under the mentorship of Alberto Espina, who in the mid-1980s served as a youth leader of the National Union Movement (MUN), a group that supported the military regime of Augusto Pinochet. Hinzpeter met Espina at university and, with his support, was elected to the Higher Council on the MUN list. He later worked as an adviser in the youth wing of National Renewal (RN), where he met Sebastián Piñera and worked on the parliamentary campaign of Evelyn Matthei.

In 2001 he became more actively involved in politics when Sebastián Piñera and Andrés Allamand asked him to return to Santiago from North America to serve as secretary-general of National Renewal under party president Alberto Cardemil. He was later appointed first vice president (2001–2004) and member of the party’s Political Commission.

Between 2005 and 2006 he served as campaign manager for Piñera in the presidential election, after being one of the main promoters of Piñera’s candidacy separate from that of Joaquín Lavín. Following Piñera’s defeat in the runoff against Michelle Bachelet of the Socialist Party of Chile, he studied the campaigns of other right-wing leaders, including Nicolas Sarkozy, David Cameron, José María Aznar, Angela Merkel, Vicente Fox and Felipe Calderón.

Between 2009 and 2010 he again led Piñera’s presidential campaign, which resulted in victory.

=== Minister of State ===
In March 2010 he was appointed Minister of the Interior by President Sebastián Piñera.

His tenure was marked by security initiatives such as the proposed Public Order Strengthening bill, commonly referred to as the “Hinzpeter Law,” which sought to penalize certain forms of protest; the bill was ultimately not approved by Congress.

Other controversies during his time in office included police responses to social protests, the killing of student Manuel Gutiérrez during the 2011–2013 Chilean student protests, tensions with Mapuche organizations such as the Arauco-Malleco Coordinator (CAM), and police operations affecting Mapuche communities. Public opinion surveys indicated a decline in his approval ratings during his first two years in office.

During a cabinet reshuffle on 5 November 2012, he left the Interior Ministry and was appointed Minister of National Defense, replacing Andrés Allamand. He remained in that position until 11 March 2014.
