= Chile–Croatia relations =

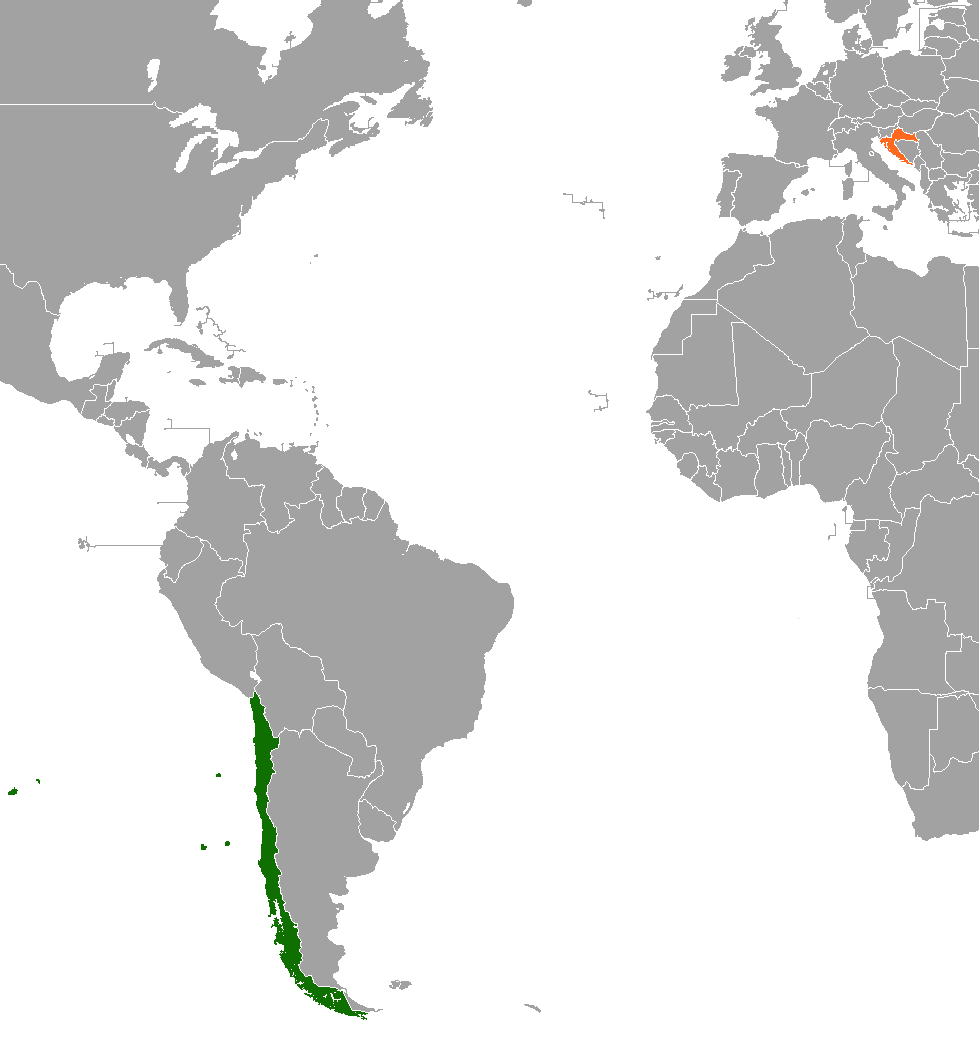

- Chile: Croatia

Chile and Croatia both enjoy friendly relations, the importance of which centers on the history of Croatian migration to Chile. There is a community of approximately 200,000 – 400,000 Chileans of Croatian descent.

== History ==
The first contact between Chile and Croatia (at the time part of the Austro-Hungarian Empire) dates back to the first half of the 19th century. In 1846, the Austro-Hungarian Empire and Chile exchanged letters of recognition which made Chile the first Latin American nation to be recognized by the Habsburg monarchy. Between 1854 and 1956, approximately 55 and 60 thousand Croatians immigrated to Chile.

In 1870, a Treaty of Friendship, Commerce and Navigation between the Austro-Hungarian Empire and Chile was signed. A diplomatic legation of the Austro-Hungarian Empire was opened in 1903 in Santiago. That same year, Chile opened a diplomatic legation in Vienna. In 1918 after World War I, the Austro-Hungarian Empire dissolved and Croatia soon became part of Yugoslavia.

In June 1991, Croatia declared its independence from Yugoslavia. During the Croatian War of Independence, the Chilean government of President Augusto Pinochet smuggled arms to Croatia despite the United Nations embargo imposed on Croatia (and all territories of Yugoslavia). On 16 January 1992 Chile recognized Croatia's independence. Three months later, on 15 April, both nations officially established diplomatic relations. In 1995, Chile opened an embassy in Zagreb.

== High level visits ==
In 2004, Chilean President Ricardo Lagos became the first Chilean head-of-state to visit Croatia. In 2005, Croatian President Stjepan Mesić reciprocated the visit to Chile becoming the first Croatian head-of-state to visit Chile. In 2013 Croatian Prime Minister Zoran Milanović paid a visit to Chile to attend the Latin America, the Caribbean and the European Union Summit in Santiago.

In 2018, Croatian President Kolinda Grabar-Kitarović paid an official visit to Chile and met with President Sebastián Piñera.

In March 2022, Gabriel Boric, of Croatian descent, became President of Chile.

== High-level visits ==
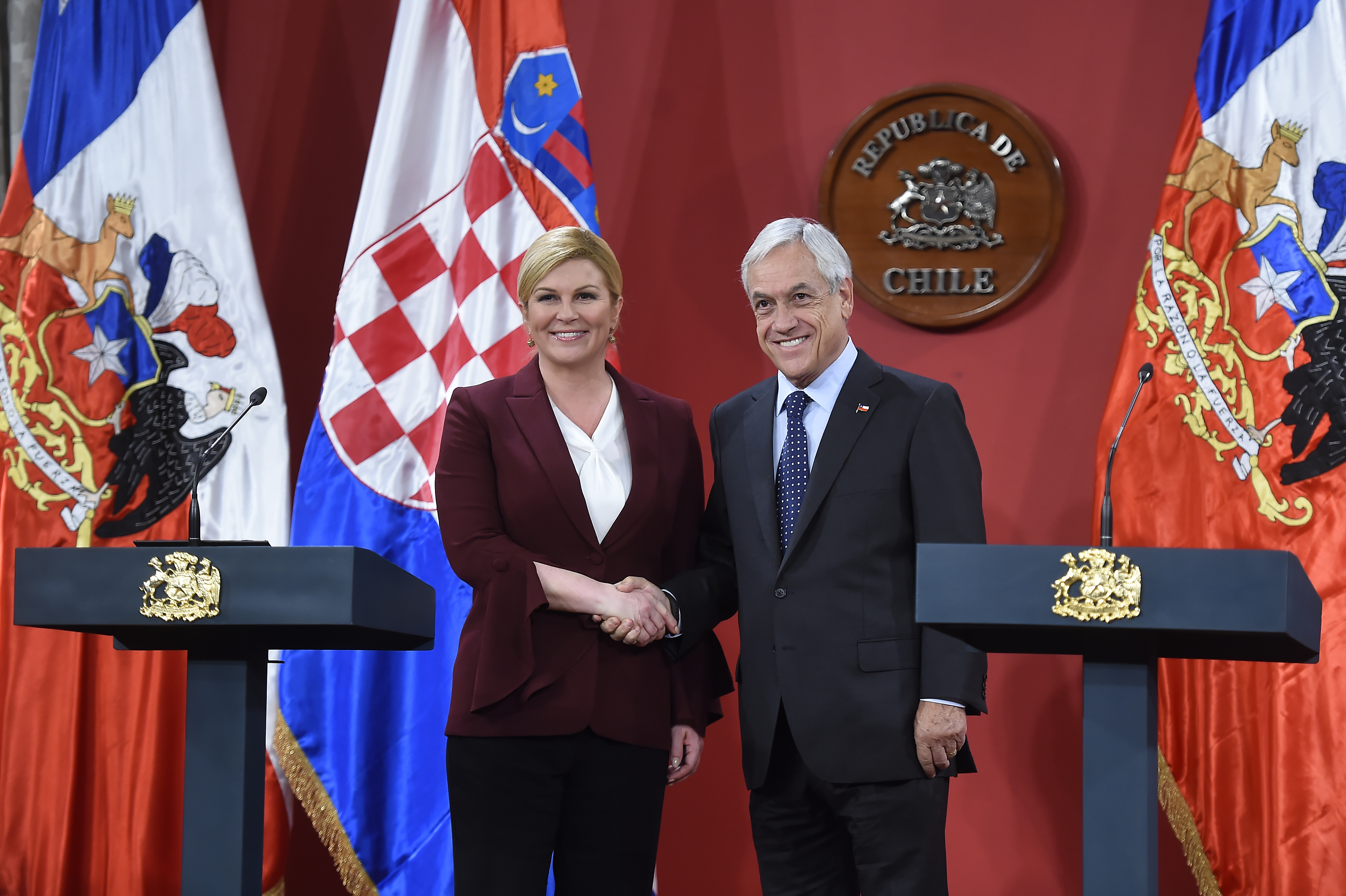
Croatian President Kolinda Grabar-Kitarović and Chilean President Sebastián Piñera in Santiago; 2018.

High-level visits from Chile to Croatia

- President Ricardo Lagos (2004)
- Senator Sergio Romero Pizarro (2006)
- Senator Baldo Prokurica (2006)

High-level visits from Croatia to Chile

- President Franjo Tudjman (1994)
- President Stjepan Mesić (2005)
- Deputy Foreign Minister Ivica Tomic (2006)
- Prime Minister Zoran Milanović (2013)
- Foreign Minister Vesna Pusić (2013, 2014, 2015)
- President Kolinda Grabar-Kitarović (2018)
- Deputy Foreign Minister Zdravka Busic (2018)
- President Zoran Milanović (2022)

== Bilateral agreements ==
Both nations have signed several bilateral agreements such as an Agreement on the elimination of tourist visas in ordinary passports (1993); Agreement on the elimination of visas in diplomatic, official and special passport holders (1995); Agreement for the Promotion and Protection of Investments (1996); Agreement on Scientific, Technical and Technological Cooperation (1997); Agreement on the avoidance of double taxation and to prevent tax evasion in relation to income tax (2005); Agreement on Paid Work for Dependent Family Members of Diplomatic, Consular, Administrative and Technical Personnel (2016); and a Memorandum of Understanding between the Ministry's of Culture of Chile and Croatia on Cultural Exchange and Cooperation (2018).

In 2002, Chile signed a free trade agreement with the European Union (which includes Croatia as of 2013 when they joined the union).

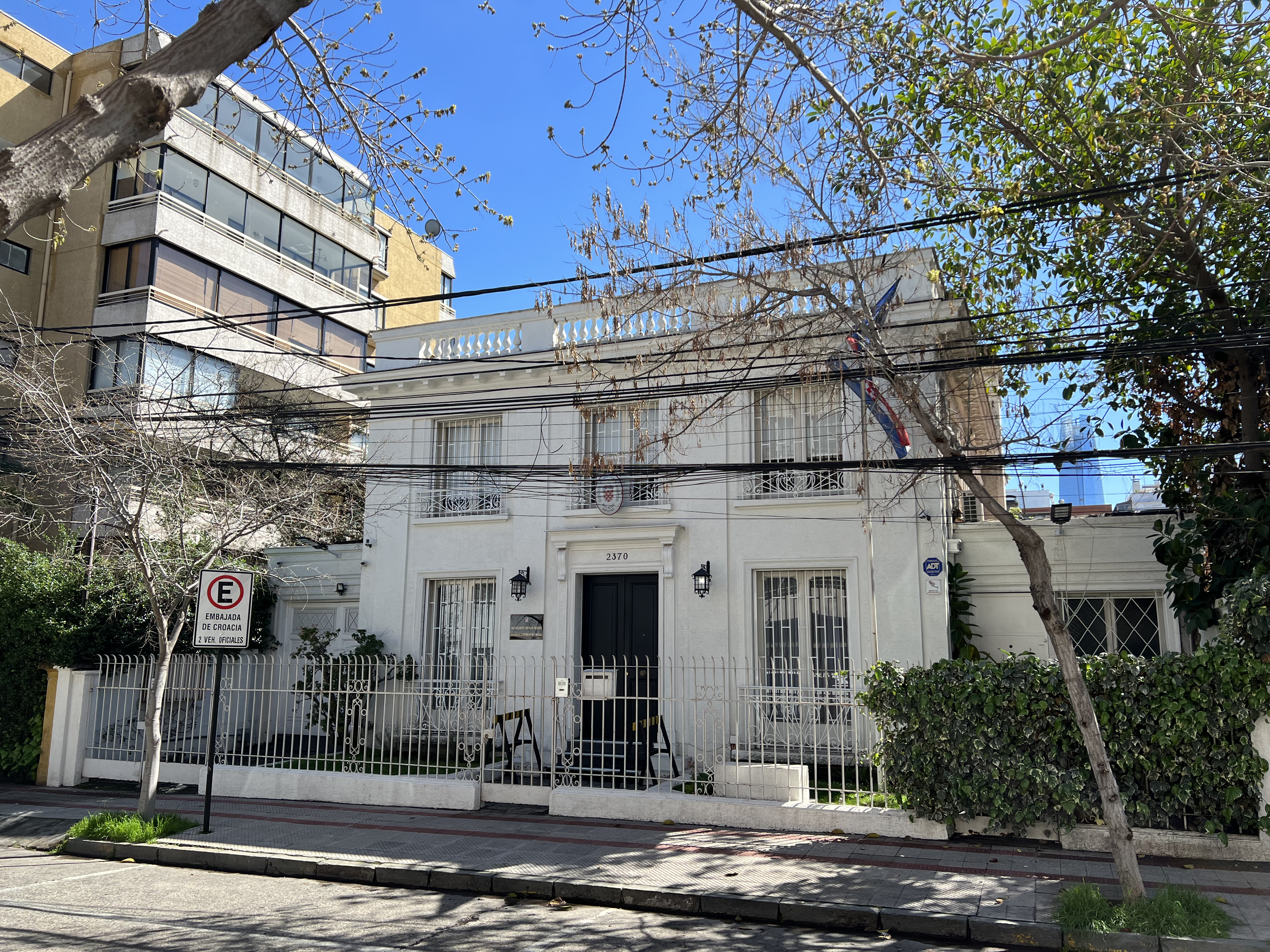
Embassy of Croatia in Santiago

== Resident diplomatic missions ==
- Chile has an embassy in Zagreb.
- Croatia has an embassy in Santiago.

== See also ==
- Croatian Chileans
