= Andrés Morales =

Chilean poet and writer (born 1962)

Andrés Morales

Juan Andrés Morales Milohnic (born 1962) is a Chilean poet and writer. He has a PhD in literature and is a full professor of the University of Chile, and a member of Academia Chilena de la Lengua (Chilean Academy of Spanish Language). He won the Pablo Neruda National Prize in 2001.

He was born in Santiago.

== Poetry ==
- Por ínsulas extrañas (1982)
- Soliloquio de fuego (1984)
- Lázaro siempre llora (1985)
- No el azar/Hors du hasard (translated to French, 1987)
- Ejercicio del decir (1989)
- Verbo (1991)
- Vicio de belleza (1992)
- Visión del oráculo (1993)
- Fragments of the Age of Objects (translated to English, 1994)
- Romper los ojos (1995)
- El arte de la guerra (1995)
- Oracle and other poems (translated to English, 1997)
- Escenas del derrumbe de Occidente (1998)
- Réquiem (2001)
- Antología Personal (2001)
- Izabrane Pjesme (translated to Croatian, 2002)
- Memoria Muerta (2003)
- Demonio de la nada (2005)
- Los Cantos de la Sibila (2009)

== Essays and anthologies ==
- Antología Poética de Vicente Huidobro (1993)
- Un ángulo del mundo. Muestra de poesía iberoamericana actual (1993)
- Poesía croata contemporánea (1997)
- Anguitología, Poesía y Prosa de Eduardo Anguita (1999)
- España reunida: Antología poética de la guerra civil española (1999)
- Altazor de puño y letra (1999)
- Poesía y Prosa de Miguel Arteche (2001)
- De Palabra y Obra (2003)

== Awards ==
- Prize of Poetry "Manantial", Universidad de Chile (1980)
- Prize of Poetry "Miguel Hernández"(Buenos Aires, Argentina, 1983)
- Fellowship Pablo Neruda of Pablo Neruda Foundation (1988)
- International Fellowship for Hispanic Studies, Ministerio de Asuntos Exteriores de España (Madrid, Spain, 1995)
- National Fellowship of Culture and Arts of 1992 and 1996
- National Fellowship of Creative Writing 2001, Fundación Andes, Chile
- National Prize of Poetry Pablo Neruda 2001
- Fellowship of Creative Writing, National Council of Culture and Arts of Chile 2001, 2004 and 2008
- Essay Prize “Centro Cultural de España” 2002 and 2003
- International Prize of Poetry "La Porte des Poetes" (Paris, France, 2007)
