= Quiñenco =

Chile-based company

- Company type: S.A. (corporation)
- Traded as: BCS: CHILE
- Industry: Holding
- Founded: 1957
- Headquarters: Santiago, Chile
- Key people: Andrónico Luksic Craig, (chairman) Guillermo Luksic Craig (former chairman)
- Revenue: ▲US$ 20 billion (2014)
- Number of employees: 69,000
- Website: www.quinenco.cl

Quiñenco S.A is a Chile-based company engaged in the investment in companies active in the industrial and financial sectors. It is one of Chile’s largest business conglomerates, with US$71 billion in assets under management. Founded in 1957 by Andrónico Luksic, Quiñenco is controlled by Chile’s Grupo Luksic.

The Luksic family owns 81% of Quiñenco’s shares. The Luksic family is the 4th richest family in Latin America, according to a Forbes ranking. Andrónico Luksic Craig became chairman of the holding entity Quiñenco in 2013. He had first been appointed as a director at Quiñenco in 1978.

Quiñenco has two joint ventures with Grupo Cartes in Paraguay, Bebidas del Paraguay through Compañía de las Cervecerías Unidas and Enex Paraguay through Enex.

== Divisions ==
The Company's business is structured into six divisions: Financial Services, Beverage & Food, Manufacturing, Energy, Transport, and Port & Shipping Services. The group employs around 69,000 people in Chile and worldwide and its companies generated an aggregated sales revenue of US$20 billion in 2014.

Major subsidiaries and associate companies that are part of the conglomerate, with percentage of equity participation:

- Banco de Chile - bank (51.3%)
- Compañía de las Cervecerías Unidas- beverage producer (60%)
- TechPack- packaging manufacturer (65.9%)
- CSAV- shipping line (55.2%)
- SM SAAM — port and tug boat operator (42.4%)
- ENEX- fuel (100%)
- Nexans- cable manufacturer of which Quiñenco is main shareholder (28.6%)

The Luksic Group’s mining and railway investments are managed by Antofagasta plc. Quiñenco is listed on the Santiago stock exchange and other Chilean exchanges. Most Quiñenco operating companies are also listed in Chile. In addition, important Quiñenco subsidiaries such as Banco de Chile and CCU are listed on NYSE.

== Governance ==
Since 2013, Andrónico Luksic Craig is the chairman of Quiñenco.
