= Astrid Fugellie =

Chilean poet (born 1949)

Astrid Fugellie (born in 1949 in Punta Arenas) is a Chilean poet.

She studied to be a school teacher at the University of Chile and she worked as a school teacher in Santiago.

She is the founder of the Culture House in Punta Arenas and of the magazine El Corchete, and she presents several radio program.

== Works ==
- 1966 Poemas
- 1969 Siete poemas
- 1975 Una casa en la lluvia
- 1982 Quién es quién en las letras chilenas
- 1984 Las jornadas del silencio
- 1986 Travesías
- 1987 Chile enlutado
- 1987 A manos del año
- 1988 Los círculos
- 1991 Dioses del sueño
- 1999 Llaves para una maga
- 2003 De ánimas y mandas, animitas chilenas desde el subsuelo
- 2005 La tierra de los arlequines, ese arco que se forma después de la lluvia
- 2005 La generación de las palomas

== Prizes ==
- 1988 Premio de la Academia Chilena de la Lengua, por Los círculos.
- Concurso literario Rostro de Chile.
- Diploma de honor en el concurso literario La Prensa Austral.
