= Juan Koscina =

Chilean footballer (1946–2005)

Personal information
- Full name: Juan Ulises Koscina González
- Date of birth: 1 June 1946
- Place of birth: Vallenar, Chile
- Date of death: 2 March 2005 (aged 58)
- Place of death: La Serena, Chile
- Height: 1.78 m (5 ft 10 in)
- Position: Midfielder

Youth career
- 1957–1965: Deportes La Serena

Senior career*
Years	Team	Apps	(Gls)
1966–1969	Deportes La Serena	108	(17)
1970–1972	Colo-Colo	27	(5)
1973–1975	Deportes La Serena	65	(7)
1976–1978	Universidad de Chile	53	(4)
1979	Trasandino		
1981–1982	Aurora FC		
1982–1984	Deportes La Serena	55	(1)
- * Club domestic league appearances and goals

Juan Ulises Koscina González (1 June 1946 – 2 March 2005) was a Chilean footballer who played as a midfielder. Besides in Chile, he played in Guatemala.

== Career ==
Koscina came to the Deportes La Serena youth system at the age of eleven. Considered a historical player, he spent three stints with them, mainly in the Chilean top division. He made his debut in 1966, scoring a goal against Colo-Colo. In the 1983 Segunda División, they earned the promotion to the top division after winning the mini-league alongside the classic rival, Coquimbo Unido.

In the Chilean top level, he also played for Colo-Colo and Universidad de Chile, classic rivals. He spent three season with the first, winning league titles in 1970 and 1972. For Universidad de Chile, he played between 1976 and 1978, coinciding with players such as Jorge Socías, Jorge Luis Ghiso, Arturo Salah and Jorge Spedaletti.

In the Chilean Segunda División, he also played for Trasandino in 1979.

Abroad, he had a stint with Guatemalan Liga Nacional side Aurora FC in 1981–82.

He retired after playing for Deportes La Serena in 1984.

== Personal life ==
His father was a well-known sportsman from La Serena.

At the beginning of his career, he was nicknamed Hippie due to his hairstyle and reputation. During his stint with Universidad de Chile, he was nicknamed Papillón, however, he was mainly known as Mago (Magician).

As an anecdote, it was said he didn't matter the money. According to the former leader of Deportes La Serena, Ottmar Rendic, he suggested him to trial with Real Madrid, but he rejected the chance.
