= United Centre (Chile) =

United Centre Centro Unido
- Abbreviation: CU
- President: Cristián Contreras Radovic
- Secretary-General: Olga Tosto García
- Treasurer: Patricia Ñúñez Alburns
- Founded: 7 January 2021
- Dissolved: 3 February 2022
- Headquarters: Pascual Baburizza 728, Ñuñoa, Santiago de Chile
- Ideology: Confucianism; Conspiracism; Spiritualism; Anti-globalism
- National affiliation: United Independents
- Colours: Green
- Slogan: «Together for a more conscious Chile» (Spanish: «Juntos por un Chile más consciente»)
- Chamber of Deputies: 1 / 155
- Senate: 0 / 43

Website
- centro-unido.cl

The United Centre (Spanish: Centro Unido; CU) was a Chilean political party that defined itself as transversal and centrist. It was created in early 2021 and is in the process of being legalized by the Electoral Service. It was led by Cristián Contreras Radovic, who expressed interest in presenting a presidential candidacy in the 2021 elections, but later became a candidate for Senator. It held one seat in the Chamber of Deputies of Chile prior to its dissolution, after which its member sat as an independent.

The party was dissolved in February 2022 because it did not receive at least 5% of votes in the 2021 parliamentary elections to maintain its legality.

== History ==
The origins of the group date back to November 2020, when journalist Cristián Contreras began the process of gathering support for a future political party. On January 7, 2021, the United Centre deed of incorporation was signed, which began the procedures before the Electoral Service of Chile (Servel) to begin its legalization process, which concluded on February 23 with the publication of the articles of incorporation.

On June 17, 2021, the party announced that it had reached 18,775 signatures, which would allow it to establish itself in the regions of Antofagasta, Coquimbo, Valparaíso, Metropolitana, O'Higgins, Maule, Biobío, Araucanía and Los Lagos. For the collection of signatures, the party had the support of Gino Lorenzini and Franco Parisi, both promoters of the Party of the People, who seek to develop a joint list of parliamentary candidates with United Centre.

== Controversies ==
The president of the party, Cristián Contreras Radovic, was criticized on several occasions for not wearing a mask in public spaces during the COVID-19 pandemic in Chile, especially in public events to collect signatures for the party.

== Leadership ==
- President: Cristián Contreras Radovic
- General Secretary: Olga Tosto García
- Treasurer: Patricia Ñúñez Alburns

== Electoral history ==
=== Congress election ===
Election year	Chamber of Deputies			Senate			Status
Election year	# Votes	% Votes	Seats	# Votes	% Votes	Seats	Status
2021	177,105	2.80	1 / 155	158,134	3.39%	0 / 50	
