= Cristián Contreras =

Chilean journalist, writer, doctor of philosophy and lecturer

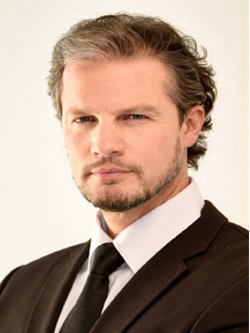

Member of the Chamber of Deputies
- Incumbent
- Assumed office 11 March 2026
- Constituency: 8th District

Personal details
- Born: 21 December 1969 (age 56) Viña del Mar, Chile
- Party: Party of the People (since 2025)
- Other political affiliations: United Center (2021-2022)
- Spouse: Heidi Schulz
- Children: 3
- Relatives: Ángela Contreras (sister)
- Website: www.docfiles.cl (in Spanish)

Cristián Alejandro Contreras Radovic (born 21 December 1969), popularly known as Dr. File, is a Chilean journalist, writer, and philosopher known for spreading conspiracy theories and pseudosciences in the Chilean media.

He was the leader of the political party United Center, and was also a candidate for becoming a Senator of the Metropolitan Region of Chile. In 2025, Contreras was elected deputy as a member of the Party of the People (PDG).

== Biography ==
He was born in Viña del Mar and has a sister, Ángela Contreras Radovic, who is an actress and a fellow supporter of the United Center party. His grandfather, Gracija Radović Ercegović (1913-1995) immigrated from Montenegro, Yugoslavia in 1926, when he was only 13 years old.

He studied journalism at the Gabriela Mistral University and philosophy at the Autonomous University of Barcelona between 1988 and 1999.

In the 1990s he carried started out his professional practice as a journalist on the Chilean television channel La Red and worked as a correspondent for the US network NBC. During 2018, he also worked at the television channel Chilevisión.

Between 2020 and 2021, he worked on creating the party United Centre, which he leads, and he manifested intentions of becoming a candidate for the 2021 Chilean presidential elections, although he later decided on becoming a candidate to become a senator for the Metropolitan Region instead.

He is married to Heidi Schulz and has one daughter and two sons.

== Views ==
Cristián Contreras Radovic has often been the subject of controversy, as he has refused to wear surgical masks during the COVID-19 pandemic, and believes in the popularly-dubbed "plandemic" conspiracy theory, which consists of the idea that the pandemic was artificially created. He is also against the scientific consensus that the HIV virus causes AIDS, instead claiming that it is caused by HIV-treatment drugs.

He is a self-declared centrist, claiming that "we have to hit the left and the right with a stick" and that "capitalists and communists have been corrupted by power and driven Chile towards the path of resentment, inequality, and a wide array of vices arising from the darkest forms of matter".

== Bibliography ==
- Contreras Radovic, Cristián (2005). ¿Por qué ocurrió el Big-Bang? [Why did the Big-Bang occur?] (in Spanish). Chile: Editorial Universitaria. ISBN 9789561117969.
- Contreras Radovic, Cristián (2009). La teoría del Big Bang y la perfección de la sabiduría [The Big Bang theory and the perfection of wisdom] (in Spanish). Chile: Editorial Universitaria. ISBN 9789561120709.
- Contreras Radovic, Cristián (2012). Politikon 2012: una teoría política sobre una fundación cultural en Sudamérica y el rol de Chile [Politikon 2012: A political theory about a cultural foundation in South America and the role of Chile] (in Spanish). Chile: Editorial Universitaria. ISBN 9789561123649.
