= CSAV =

Chilean shipping company

Compañía Sudamericana de Vapores, S.A.

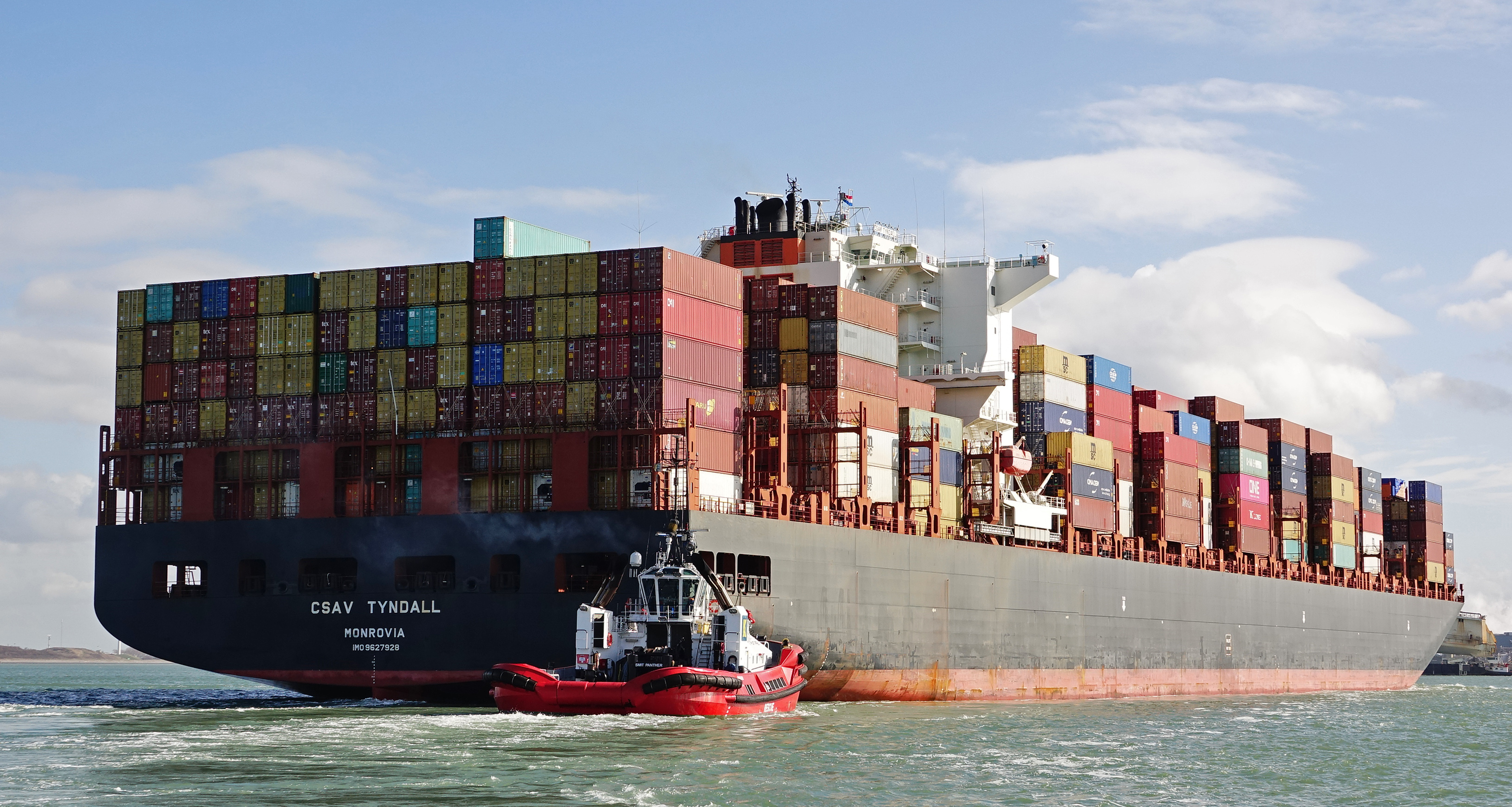
- Type: Sociedad Anónima
- Traded as: BCS: VAPORES
- Industry: Shipping
- Founded: 1872; 154 years ago
- Headquarters: Valparaíso, Chile
- Key people: Oscar Hasbún Martínez, (CEO); Francisco Pérez Mackenna, (Chairman) Andrónico Luksic Craig (Vice Chairman)
- Products: Bulk; Cars; Container; Reefer
- Revenue: US$ 3.2 billion (2013)
- Number of employees: 4,000+
- Website: www.csav.com
- Footnotes House flag of CSAV

CSAV (Compañía Sudamericana de Vapores) is a Chilean shipping company that is currently the largest company of its type in Latin America and also one of the oldest ones, having been founded in 1872.

Originally, the company's business consisted exclusively of coastal shipping, but had a rapid expansion from the west coast of South America to the Panama Canal when this was opened to regular traffic. Soon, its business expanded further to offer shipping to the rest of the world. Now, their main business is container shipping and offers others services like dry bulk, liquid bulk, refrigerated cargo and vehicle transport. CSAV, like its subsidiaries Libra, Libra Uruguay y CSAV Norasia, carry cargo mainly in containers.

The company is listed on the Santiago Stock Exchange since 1893. With over 140 years, CSAV has played a crucial role in the development of foreign trade in Latin America.

Previously owned by the Claro Group, CSAV is now controlled by the Luksic Group since February 2012.

== Company overview ==
Founded in 1872 and listed since 1893, CSAV (Compania Sud Americana de Vapores) is one of the oldest shipping lines. It is the largest shipping company in Latin America and number 20 in the world, according to Alphaliner.

CSAV, in the early years, was the only means of connectivity for Chile with distant regions in the far flung country.

CSAV's main business is container shipping, which accounts for approx. 90% of total sales. Other businesses are car carrier, non-containerized refrigerated cargo, dry bulk and liquid bulk transport. CSAV is focused on the Latin American market, which accounted for more than 70% of total traffic in 2013

In March 2011, Quinenco S.A. took a strategic decision to enter the shipping sector with its investment in CSAV, subsequently increased to 54.5%

At the end of 2013, CSAV operated 50 container ships and 32 line services (plus feeder lines) across five continents, with approximately 2 million TEUs transported during 2013 CSAV invested about U.S. $1 billion in new ships, which entered into service within the past three years. Recently the company ordered the construction of seven new ships of 9,300 TEUs each at an additional investment of U.S. $600 million. The last of these new ships was delivered in 2015. Its new, expanded own fleet will allow CSAV to significantly reduce fuel costs and replace leases.

In 2013, CSAV's sales amounted to approximately US$3.2 billion. The company has a presence in 115 countries, generating approximately 90% of total revenues with its own agencies.

CSAV is a global company with a long history: The integration in 1999 of Brazilian Libra and Uruguayan Montemar Marítima S.A. consolidated CSAV's strong presence along the East Coast of South America. By integrating Norasia in June 2000, the company strengthened its main east–west routes. As a result, CSAV has direct departures from the main ports of Asia, Europe, India and the Middle East today.

Hit hard by the global shipping crisis, CSAV incurred heavy losses in 2011, the worst year in its history. In this context, Quinenco came in as new shareholder and recapitalized CSAV with large investments

Starting in May 2011, CSAV also embarked on a deep restructuring.

The turnaround strategy had 4 pillars: Refocusing the business on Latin America; enlarging the own fleet; expanding alliances; and cutting cost throughout the organization.

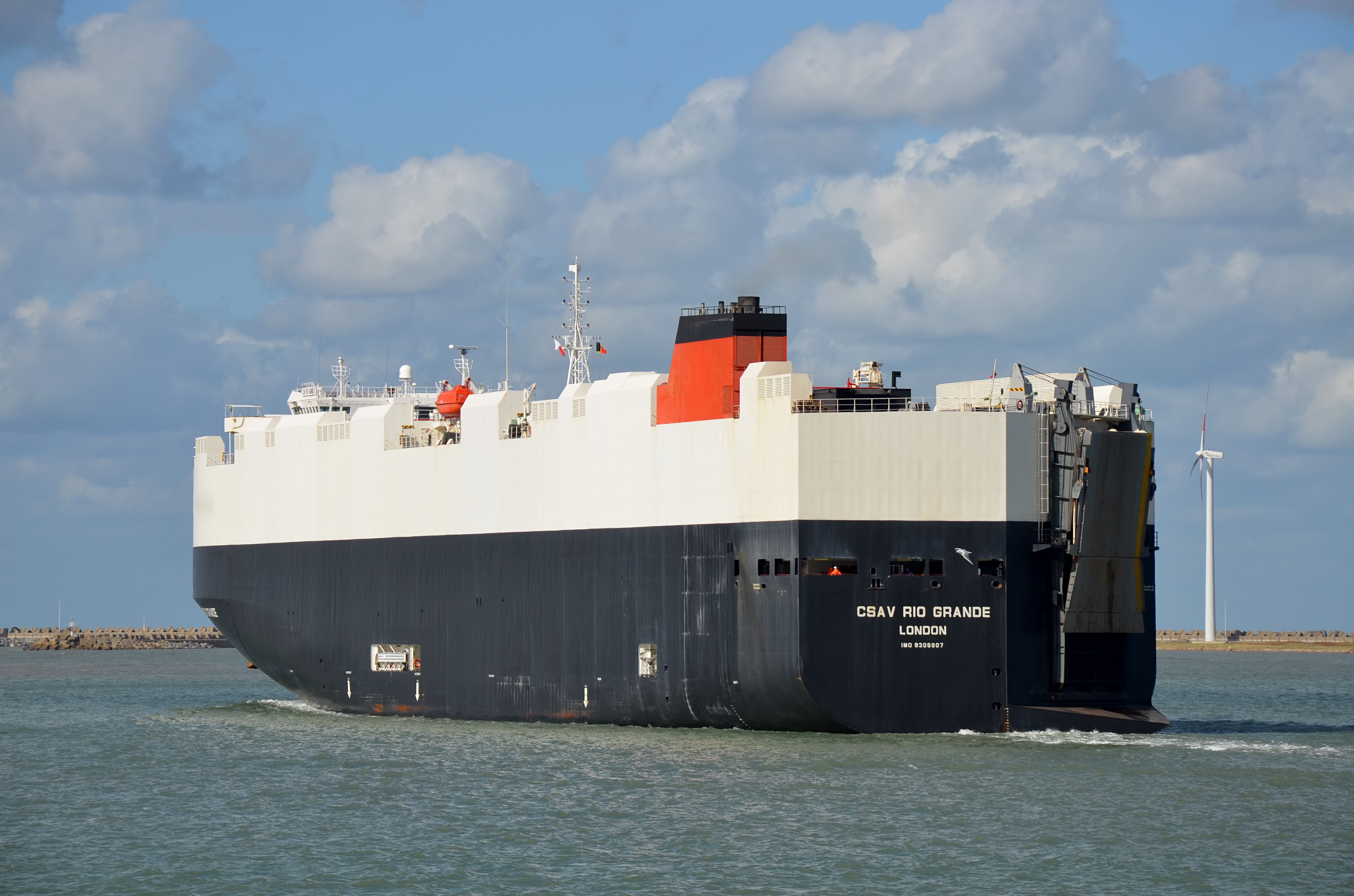
mv CSAV Rio Grande

The company remained operative in the Roll-on/roll-off sector until April 2020, with 5 services from and to South America. After this date, its services were discontinued, mainly focusing on the Container business.

While market conditions remained unchanged, the restructuring reduced CSAV's net loss by 46% to US$169 million in the year 2013. In 2012, the company had lost US$313.6 million.

Quiñenco pointed out already in 2011 that a next step after operational turnaround would be merging CSAV with a partner.

== History ==
CSAV, one of the oldest shipping companies in the world, was founded in 1872 by the merger of Compañía Chilena de Vapores and Compañía Nacional de Vapores. The company's business initially consisted exclusively of coastal shipping services but these were rapidly extended along the whole west coast of South America to the Panama Canal before this was opened to regular traffic.

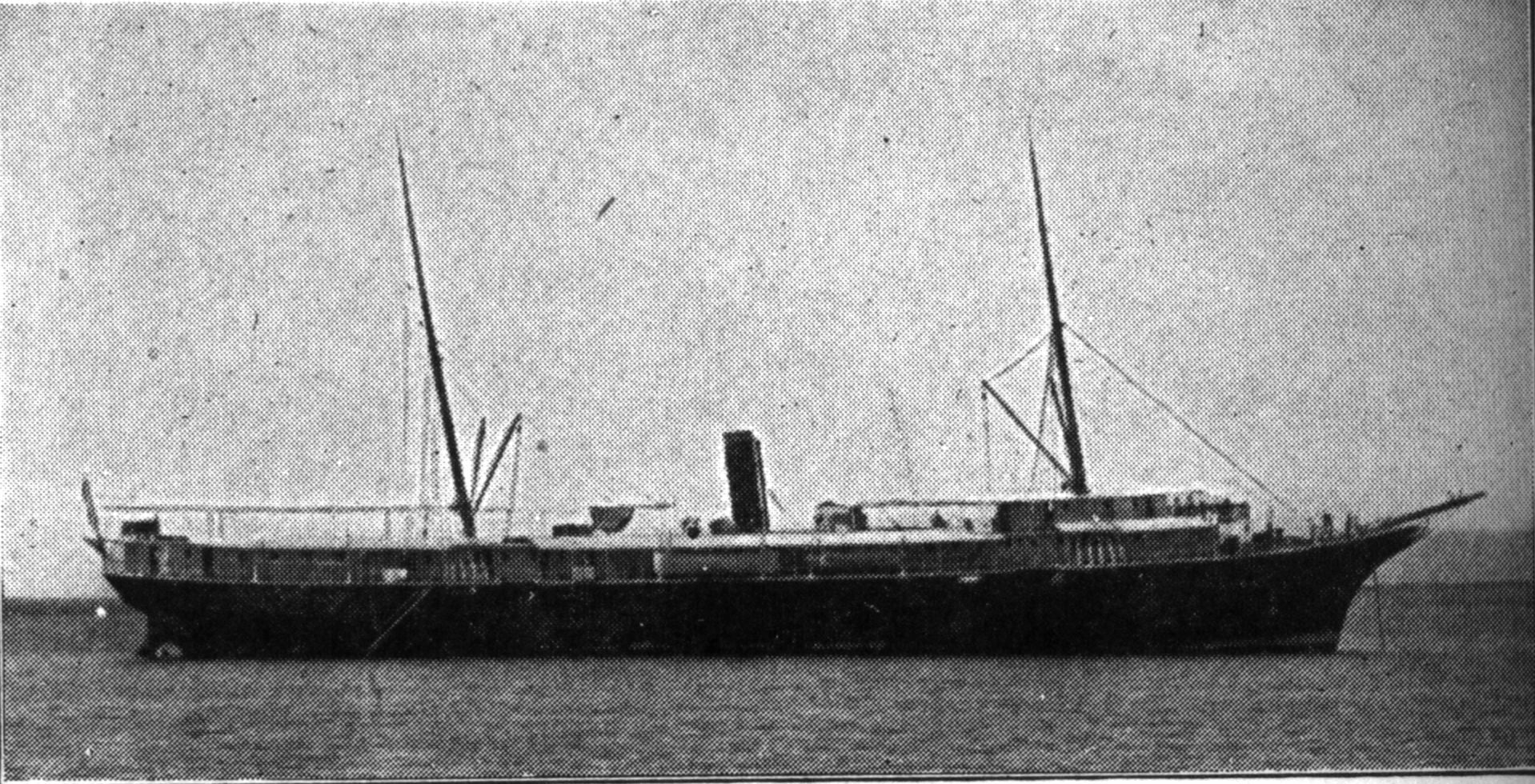
Itata, built for CSAV in 1873 and lost in heavy weather off Coquimbo in 1922

In August 1914 the First World War broke out, removing CSAV's major competitor, the British-owned Pacific Steam Navigation Company, whose ships were needed for more urgent war traffic elsewhere. In the same month the Panama Canal was opened, giving CSAV direct access to the eastern USA. For the duration of the war CSAV flourished, and after the war it prioritised its new service between Valparaíso and New York. Foreign shipyards had a backlog of orders to replace tonnage destroyed in the war, so in January 1920 CSAV bought an existing ship from Toyo Kisen Kaisha and renamed her Renaico.

However, Renaico was 22 years old and lost money on the New York route, so CSAV laid her up and in April 1920 ordered a pair of new steam turbine passenger and cargo liners for the route from Scotts Shipbuilding and Engineering Company of Greenock in Scotland. CSAV intended to order a third sister ship in early 1921, but by then demand, and hence freight rates, had fallen. CSAV suffered an additional loss because delivery of the first two ships was delayed by the continuing backlog of orders. For this combination of reasons the company did not order the intended third ship.

Scotts launched the first ship, Aconcagua, on 11 February 1922 and completed her in August. Her sister ship Teno was launched on 5 September 1922, completed in December and reached Chile in January 1923. However, the Panama Canal equally gave shipping companies from the eastern USA access to the west coast of Latin America, so now CSAV faced new competition from Grace Line. CSAV reported losses in 1922 and 1923, but from 1922 the Chilean government introduced protection measures for Chilean companies operating shipping services along the country's 2,300-nautical-mile (4,300 km)-long coast, and in 1923 global shipping rates stabilised.

In 1920 the company had been so keen to add to its fleet that it even bought the 47-year-old 1,971 GRT Itata, which had been built for CSAV in 1873 but which it had later sold. On 28 August 1922 Itata, with 322 people on board, foundered off Coquimbo after her rudder was smashed in a heavy sea. She launched three lifeboats but all capsized, and only 13 survivors reached land. The other 309 were either dead or missing and presumed dead.

The Wall Street crash of October 1929 started the Great Depression, which destroyed the export market for Chilean nitratine and sharply reduced demand for Chilean copper. The loss of export income significantly reduced Chile's ability to afford imports from overseas, so CSAV's trade both in and out of Chile fell rapidly. At the time of the crash, CSAV had a new refrigerated cargo ship on order from Lithgows in Scotland, the 5,348 GRT Toltén, launched in July 1930. By the time Lithgows completed her in October 1930 there was not enough work for CSAV's fleet, leaving the company unable to pay for the new ship, so in 1931 Lithgows repossessed her.

CSAV's Valparaíso – New York route suffered the greatest loss, so in June 1931 the company suspended the service and made over Aconcagua and Teno to Lithgows in lieu of payment for Toltén. CSAV had not told its shareholders, so when the deal became known there was an outcry in Chilean newspapers. But CSAV continued to lose money, and in August 1932 Aconcagua, Teno and Toltén all returned to Scotland.

In the mid-1930s trade started to recover, so in June 1936 CSAV ordered three new diesel-powered cargo liners from Nakskov Skibsværft in Denmark. Each was just over 7,200 GRT, had a speed of 17 knots (31 km/h), and refrigerated holds for the export of fruit to Europe. Each ship also had berths for 164 passengers: 32 in first class and 132 in tourist class. In March 1938 the first of the trio, Copiapó, started CSAV's trade with Europe. Nakskov completed her sister ships Aconcagua in April and Imperial in June. In October the ships on return runs from Europe started to call at New York to load cargo and embark passengers to Chile.

All three of the new diesel ships were offered by Chile as part of its contribution to the Allied effort in World War II and became troop ships operating as the United States Army Transports USAT Aconcagua, USAT Copiapo and USAT Imperial. The War Shipping Administration (WSA) purchased the ships in 1943 and allocated them to the Army for conversion. All the ships were sold to Turkey after layup at the end of the war.

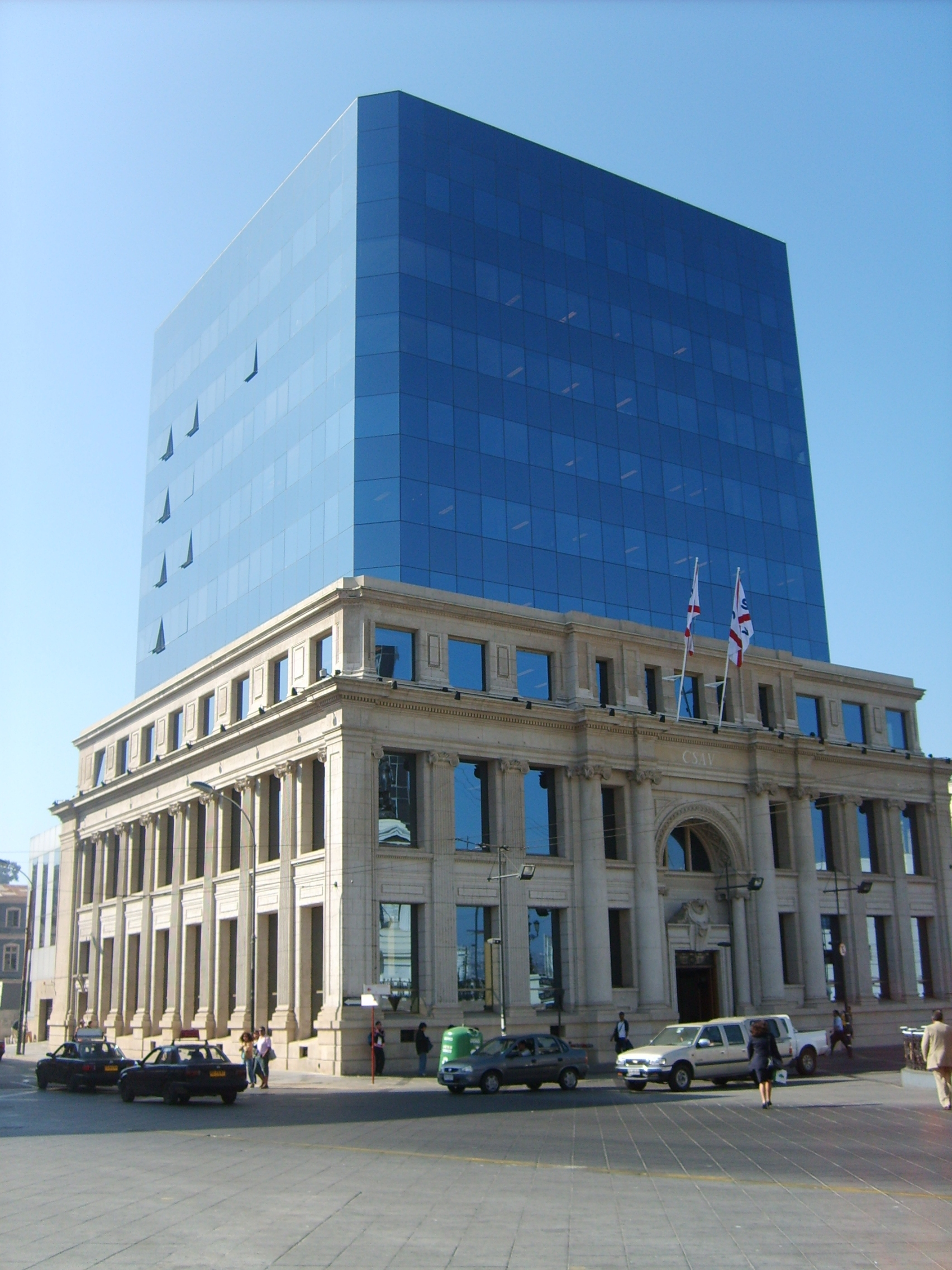
CSAV headquarters in Valparaíso.

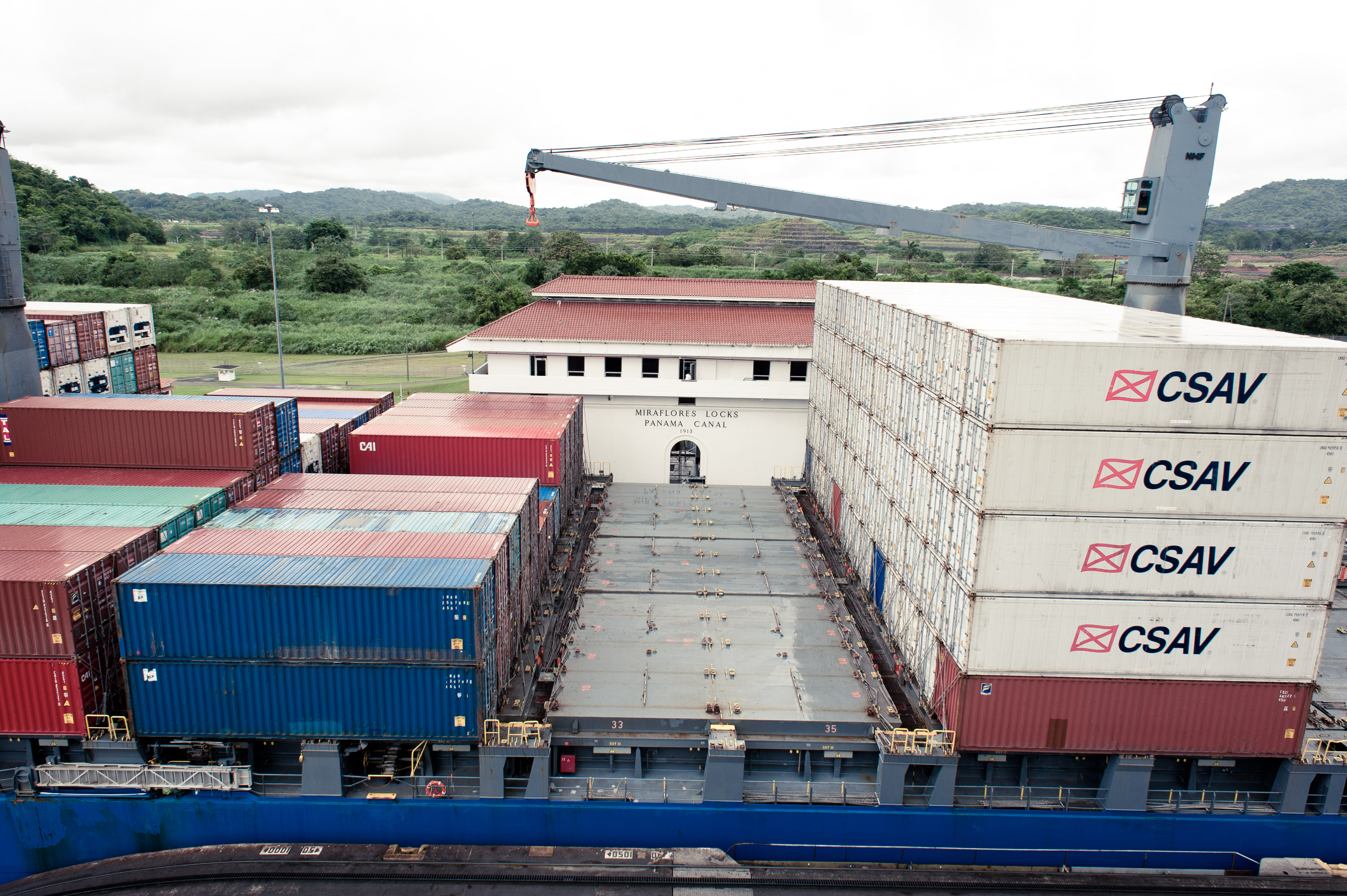
CSAV containers on a ship in the Panama Canal.

Subsequently, CSAV extended the scope of its business to the Far East and Japan, South-East Asia/Pacific Islands and the east coast of South America. The company today offers services for general and bulk cargo, fresh and frozen products and vehicles, using its own and chartered ships, and establishing permanent links between the Atlantic and Pacific coasts of South America and the rest of the world.

The growth in trade between the different regions of the world has been essential to the current and future development of all countries and other economic benefits. CSAV has therefore seized the opportunities generated by global sea trade, adapting its services to customer requirements and establishing new routes and services, managing to unite Latin America with the world's most important ports conveniently and efficiently.

CSAV operates in the five continents, offering line services for which it is able to provide permanent traffic to certain ports, fixed itineraries and ships designed for carrying large numbers of containers and a wide variety of conventional cargo. The company therefore has especially designed vessels for frozen cargo, vehicles, bulk cargo and forestry products. Intermodal services, which combine different means of transport, have been introduced by the company, as well as complementary services like port storage and services, etc. This door-to-door service, to any destination, is normally provided together with the CSAV subsidiaries.

=== Merger with Hapag Lloyd ===
On January 22, 2014, CSAV signed a non-binding Memorandum of Understanding with Hapag-Lloyd AG (HL) that sets the frame for combining the container shipping business of CSAV with the businesses of HL. CSAV's business of car carrier, non-containerized refrigerated cargo, dry bulk and liquid bulk shipping is excluded from this proposed transaction. The proposed merger would make CSAV the largest shareholder of HL with a 30% initial stake. CSAV would sign a controlling agreement with the City of Hamburg and the entrepreneur Klaus Michael Kühne. Together, they would hold about 75.5% of a combined HL entity after the merger.

The new company would become the world's fourth largest container shipping line with a combined carrying capacity of about 1 million TEU s, transported cargo volume of nearly 7.5 million TEUs per year, and combined sales of nearly US$12 billion annually. The planned merger includes two capital increases in the combined HL entity totaling 740 million Euros. Of the first HL capital increase in the amount of 370 million Euros, 259 million Euros (ap-prox. 70%) would be subscribed by CSAV within 120 days of the merger transaction. This would increase CSAV's stake in a merged HL to close to 34%.

In preparation of the planned merger with HL, the CSAV board on February 13, 2014, decided to proceed with two capital increases at CSAV itself. The second CSAV capital increase for up to US$400 million was to be carried out only if the merger of CSAV's container business with HL materialized.

On April 16, 2014, CSAV and HL signed a binding merger agreement. In December 2014 the final permissions were granted and the merge carried forward.

== Sources ==
- de la Pedraja, Rene (1998). Oil and Coffee: Latin American Merchant Shipping from the Imperial Era to the 1950s. Westport, CT: Greenwood Publishing Group. ISBN 031330839X.
