= Madeco =

Madeco S.A.
- Industry: Investment
- Founded: 2013
- Headquarters: Santiago, Chile
- Key people: Felipe Joannon Vergara (chairman)
- Products: Flexible packaging, cooper pipes, aluminium and PVC profiles
- Owner: Luksic Group
- Subsidiaries: Alusa; Indamun; Madeco Mills
- Website: www.madeco.cl

Madeco S.A. is a diversified group of industrial companies manufacturing flexible packaging mainly for the food industry, copper tubes and aluminum and PVC window and door profiles. The company is based in Chile and also operates in Argentina, Colombia and Peru through its subsidiary Alusa.

Madeco belongs to Quiñenco, part of Luksic Group.

Madeco S.A. trades on the Santiago stock exchange under the name MADECO.

== History ==
Madeco was founded as a result of the division of Madeco S.A. (currently Invexans S.A.), agreed by the Extraordinary Shareholders' Meeting held on March 27, 2013.
