= Jean-Paul Luksic Fontbona =

Chilean heir and businessman

Jean–Paul Luksic Fontbona
- Occupations: Chairman, Antofagasta PLC
- Children: 3
- Parent(s): Andrónico Luksic Abaroa; Iris Fontbona

Jean–Paul Luksic Fontbona is a Chilean heir and businessman.

== Early life ==
His late father was Andrónico Luksic, founder of Luksic Group, including Antofagasta PLC, Minera Los Pelambres, Minera Michilla, and Minera El Tesoro. He is an heir to the wealthiest family in Chile. He received a Bachelor of Science in Management and Science from the London School of Economics.

== Career ==
He is chairman of Antofagasta PLC. He also sits on the board of directors of Madeco.
