= Andrónico Luksic Abaroa =

Chilean businessman of Croatian and Bolivian origin

- Born: 5 November 1926; Antofagasta, Chile
- Died: 18 August 2005 (aged 78); Santiago, Chile
- Spouses: Ena Craig (m. 1953; died 1959) Iris Fontbona (m. 1962–2005)
- Children: Andrónico Luksic Craig; Guillermo Luksic Craig; Paola Luksic Fontbona; Gabriela Luksic Fontbona; Jean-Paul Luksic Fontbona
- Parents: Polikarp Lukšić Ljubetić (father); Elena Abaroa Córdoba (mother)
- Relatives: Eduardo Abaroa (great-grandfather)

Antonio Andrónico Luksic Abaroa (5 November 1926 – 18 August 2005) was a Chilean businessman. He founded the Luksic Group, becoming the richest person in Chile, the fourth in Latin America, and the 132nd in the world, with a net worth in 2005 of US$4.2 billion according to Forbes magazine. The Luksic Group has interests in the mining, financial, industrial, and beverages sectors. Major holdings include, or have included, Banco de Chile, Compañía de las Cervecerías Unidas (CCU), and Antofagasta plc, a UK-listed copper mining company. In Croatia, the group was involved in the tourist industry.

In September 2002, the Chilean newspaper El Mercurio published an interview with Andrónico Luksic titled "Don Andrónico cuenta su historia" (Don Andrónico shares his story), in which he explains how, after a life of hard work, he had decided to retire and "dedicate himself to what he liked the most: his family, his beloved Croatia and social assistance".

== Family ==
Luksic was born in Antofagasta, to a Bolivian mother, Elena Abaroa Córdova (grandchild of Bolivian War of the Pacific hero Eduardo Abaroa), and a Croatian immigrant father, Polikarp Lukšić Ljubetić, who had arrived in Chile from the Adriatic island of Brač in 1910 and had made a living in the nitrate industry.

Luksic married Ena del Carmen Craig Monett in 1953 and they had two sons: Andrónico (born 16 April 1954) and Guillermo (14 January 1956 – 2013) Luksic was widowed when Ena died in 1959. He married Iris Fontbona González in 1961, when she was 18 years old. They had two daughters: Paola (born 1961/1962) and Gabriela (born 1962/1963), and one son: Jean-Paul Luksic Fontbona (born 31 May 1964).

== Death ==
Antonio Andrónico Luksic Abaroa died of cancer on 18 August 2005, aged 78, in Santiago de Chile. As of 2011, his widow Iris Fontbona and their family had a net worth of US$19.2 billion. As of October 2012 the Bloomberg Billionaires Index lists Iris Fontbona, who lives in Santiago as the 33rd richest person in the world with an estimated net worth of $19.7 billion. The Forbes 2016 lists Iris Fontbona Chile's richest person with a $13.8 billion mining assets fortune (or a $15.5 billion total fortune she shares with the rest of her immediate family), making her the fourth-richest in the region. Her net worth is equivalent to 6% of Chile's GDP. As of November 2022 Forbes Billionaire List, the Luksic family had a net worth of $22.8 billion and are considered the #83 richest family in the world.
