= Largest copper companies =

List of mining companies

This article lists the world’s leading copper mining companies ranked by their mined copper output for the 2024 calendar (or 2023/24 fiscal) year. Production figures refer to contained copper in concentrate or cathode produced directly from company-owned mines and joint-venture interests.

== Methodology ==
Data for 2024 were taken from each company’s publicly released production report, annual report, or audited financial statements. When companies report in fiscal years, the figure corresponding most closely to calendar 2024 is used. All tonnages are rounded to the nearest thousand tonnes (kt).

== 2024 ranking ==
Rank	Company	Headquarters	Mined copper in 2024 (kt)	Major operations
1	Freeport-McMoRan	United States	1,900	Grasberg JV (Indonesia); Cerro Verde (Peru); Morenci (USA)
2	BHP	Australia	1,865	Escondida JV & Spence (Chile); Antamina JV (Peru); Olympic Dam (Australia)
3	Codelco	Chile	1,329	Chuquicamata, El Teniente, Radomiro Tomic (Chile)
4	Zijin Mining	China	1,070	Kamoa-Kakula & Kolwezi (DRC); Čukaru Peki (Serbia); Julong (China)
5	Southern Copper	Mexico	974	Buenavista del Cobre (Mexico); Toquepala & Cuajone (Peru)
6	Glencore	Switzerland	952	Katanga & Mutanda (DRC); Mount Isa (Australia); Collahuasi JV (Chile)
7	Anglo American	United Kingdom	773	Collahuasi JV & Los Bronces JV (Chile); Quellaveco (Peru)
8	KGHM Polska Miedź	Poland	730	Lubin & Polkowice-Sieroszowice (Poland); Sierra Gorda JV (Chile)
9	Antofagasta	United Kingdom	664	Los Pelambres, Centinela JV, Antucoya JV, Zaldívar (Chile)
10	First Quantum Minerals	Canada	431	Kansanshi & Sentinel (Zambia); (Cobre Panamá suspended in Dec 2023)

MMG Limited, a 68% owned subsidiary of China Minmetals, reported 399 kt of mined copper in 2024. Minmetals’ other copper assets operated outside MMG contributed an estimated 30 kt in 2024, according to the group’s year-end operational briefing. Taken together, the total of roughly 430–435 kt would edge China Minmetals just above First Quantum's 431 kt, meaning China Minmetals could arguably rank tenth if its mined-copper interests were consolidated.

Since at least 2004 the production levels of copper Codelco has stagnated or declined, with a significant decline from 2021 to 2023. The tonnage of copper produced in 2023 was 72% of that of 2004 and the decline affects all of Codelcos mining divisions, but originated from geomechanical problems compromising the stability of three mines; El Teniente, Chuquicamata and Ministro Hales.

== See also ==
- Largest gold companies
