= Buenavista mine =

Mine in Mexico

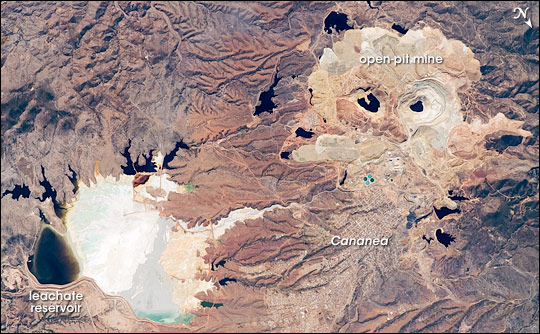
- Photo of the mine, taken from the International Space Station in 2008.

- Location within Sonora Location within Mexico
- Location: Cananea Municipality, Sonora, Mexico; 30°57′38″N 110°19′53″W
- Products: Copper, silver, zinc
- Company: Southern Copper Corporation

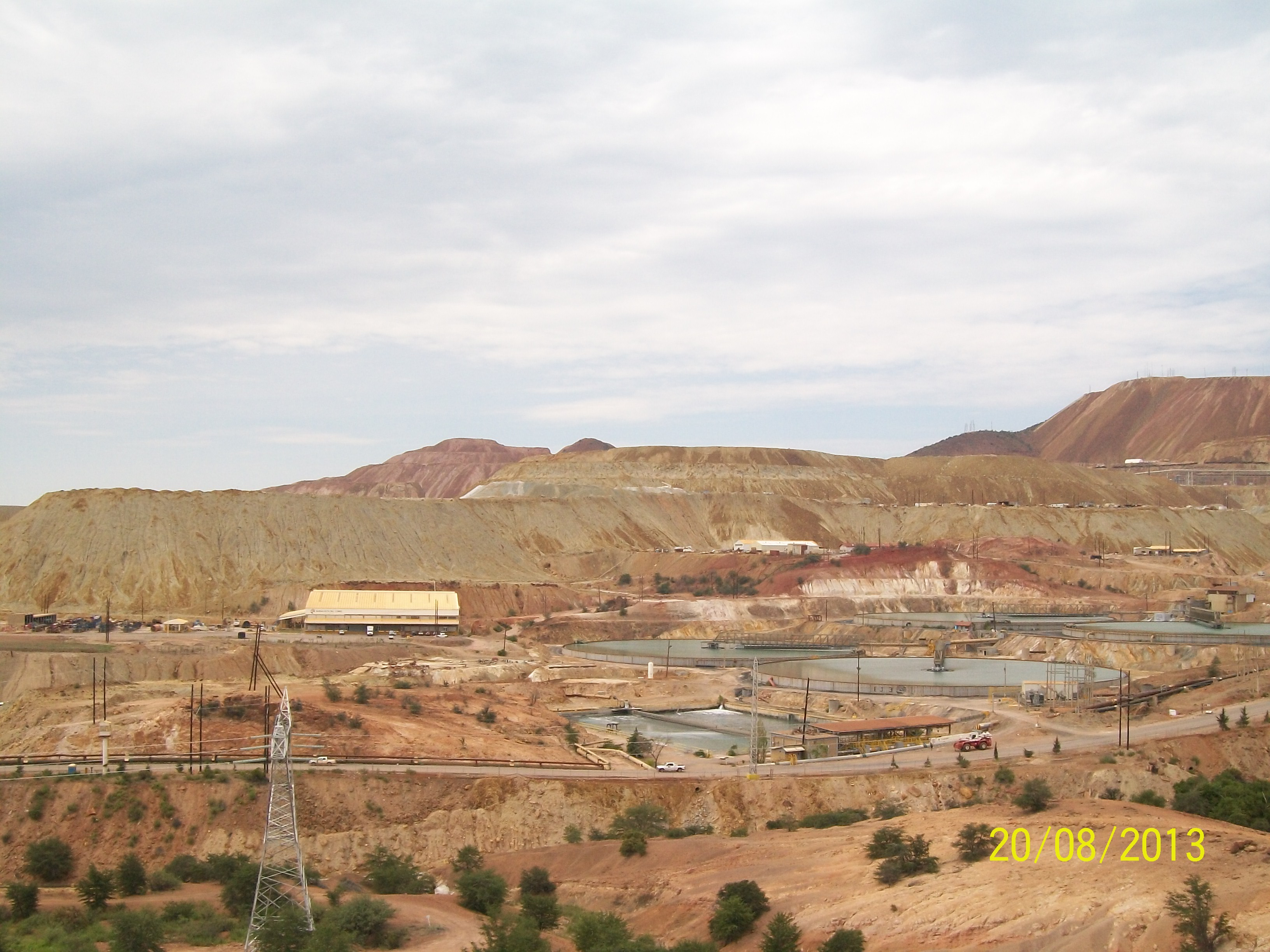
Photo taken at the mine in 2013.

The Buenavista mine, historically known as the Cananea copper mine, is a large open pit copper mine located in the north-west of Mexico in Cananea Municipality, Sonora. It lies just outside the city of Cananea 35 km (22 mi) south of the international border near Nogales, Arizona. Buenavista mine represents one of the largest copper reserves in Mexico and in the world. As of 2013, it had estimated reserves of 36 million tonnes of ore grading 0.69% copper, 3.3% zinc and 33.4 million oz of silver. Cananea represents one of the largest copper reserves in Mexico and in the world, having estimated reserves of 4.52 billion tonnes of ore with a grade of 0.42% copper.

== History ==
=== Greene Consolidated Copper Company (1896-1907) ===
Copper has been mined at the site continuously as far back as 1899. The mine was originally owned by the American businessman William Cornell Greene.

The mine was the location of the Cananea strike in 1906.

=== Anaconda Copper (1907-1972) ===
The mine was run for some time by the American company Anaconda Copper.

=== Government of Mexico (1972-1990) ===
The Mexican government mandated that ownership of the mining sector be gradually put into Mexican hands in 1961. Ownership was handed over to the company CIA Minera de Cananea SA in 1971, which was majority controlled by the Mexican government. Anaconda soon sold off its remaining minority interest.

The privatization process began in 1988, but there were several failed auctions before the mine was successfully sold. In 1990, the state company was declared bankrupt.

=== Grupo México (1990-present) ===
In 1990, the Mexican government sold the mine to a joint bid by Mexicana de Cananea headed by Jorge Larrea, and the Belgian mining company Acec-Union Miniere.

By 2003, the mine was run by Grupo México. Organized by the National Union of Mine and Metal Workers, about 1,200 workers on the mine went on strike demanding higher pay.

The mine was reopened in 2010 after being closed for three years during a strike, and the mine was renamed the Buenavista mine.

== 2014 wastewater disaster ==
In August 2014, a major ecological disaster took place at the mine when 40,000 cubic meters of wastewater spilled into the Bacanuchi and Sonora rivers. The wastewater carried sulfuric acid and it is believed to also have carried cyanide. The event prompted 88 schools to close temporarily. Mine officials have been criticized for not reporting the accident to the authorities until after 24 hours, when the residents had noticed the river water turned orange. In the wake of the disaster, Grupo México set up a $151 million clean up fund, while continuing operations. However, according to reports from El Informador, the fund was closed before 1% of funds were distributed to those affected, prompting pressure from the Office of the United Nations High Commissioner for Human Rights for full compensation.

== See also ==
- La Caridad Mine
