= Germán Larrea Mota-Velasco =

Mexican billionaire businessman

- Born: 1953 or 1954 (age 72–73); Mexico City, Mexico
- Occupations: CEO, Grupo México
- Children: 1

Germán Larrea Mota-Velasco (born October 26, 1953) is a Mexican business magnate. He is the CEO of Grupo México, Mexico's largest mining corporation, and the third largest copper producer in the world. As of June 2025, his net worth was estimated at US$31.3 billion.

== Career ==
Larrea Mota-Velasco has been chairman, president and CEO of Grupo Mexico since 1994. He was previously executive vice chairman of Grupo Mexico and has been a director since 1981.

He has served as chairman of the Southern Copper Corporation since December 1999, CEO from December 1999 to October 2004, and as a director since November 1999. He has been chairman and CEO of Grupo Ferroviario Mexicano since 1997. He has been chairman and CEO of Empresarios Industriales de Mexico, Compania Perforadora Mexico, Mexico Compania Constructora, and Fondo Inmobiliario since 1992.

He founded Grupo Impresa, a printing and publishing company in 1978, remaining as the chairman and CEO until 1989, when the company was sold. He is also a director of Banco Nacional de Mexico, which forms part of Grupo Financiero Banamex, Consejo Mexicano de Hombres de Negocios, and Grupo Televisa.

According to Forbes, he was the second richest man in Mexico, after Carlos Slim, in 2015, 2016, and 2021.

In November 2020, Larrea Mota-Velasco sold 100,000 shares in Southern Copper Corporation for a total price of $6 million, meaning he now owns a stake in the company worth almost $121 million.

In October 2025, Germán Larrea made a proposal to buy Banamex from Citibank. However, Citibank rejected the proposal on October 9.

As of January 2026, the businessman had an estimated net worth of US$68.4 billion, according to the Bloomberg Billionaires Index, ranking him eighth worldwide in terms of year-to-date gains in personal wealth.

== Personal life ==
Larrea Mota-Velasco is married with one daughter and lives in Mexico City. He owns and breeds Thoroughbreds under the nom de course of St. George Stable. His mare Letruska became the first horse that had raced in Mexico to subsequently win at the Grade I level in the United States when she won the Apple Blossom Handicap in 2021.
