= Zebina Streeter =

American renegade (1838–1889)

Zebina Nathaniel Streeter
- Born: October 8, 1838; Genoa, New York
- Died: June 26, 1889 (aged 50); Nacozari, Sonora
- Other names: Don Casimero; White Apache
- Occupations: Soldier, language interpreter, tribal leader
- Years active: 1857–1886

Zebina Streeter (October 8, 1838 – June 26, 1889) was an American renegade known for the time he spent with the Apache tribes. Beginning in the 1870s, he raided Mexico and the Southwestern United States with Juh, a Chiricahua leader. He gained a reputation as a fierce warrior, earning the nickname White Apache.

== Early life ==
Zebina Nathaniel Streeter was born in Genoa, New York on October 8, 1838 to William Adams Streeter and Hannah C. Day. He had one older brother, William Crandel Streeter. Streeter ran away at the age of 11 to voyage at sea. In 1856, he deserted from his ship in Panama. He was shot and recaptured, however, he was not forced to return to his seafaring life.

== Military career ==
By 1857, Streeter had returned to America. That year, he served under the quartermaster of Albert Sidney Johnston during the Utah War. He continued on to California to stay with his father and stepmother. Here he became close with his half-brother William Charles Streeter.

In May 1864, Streeter joined Company B of the 1st California Cavalry Battalion as a second lieutenant. He was dismissed for drunkenness after only five months, but was allowed to reenlist in Company C as a private. He was honorably discharged in December 1865.

Streeter descended into Mexico and assumed the name Don Casimero. He served under Benito Juárez in his fight against Maximilian I of Mexico. He reached the rank of colonel and was granted honorary Mexican citizenship. He relocated to Cañada Alamosa, New Mexico. Fluent in Spanish and knowledgeable in the Apache language, Streeter worked as an interpreter at Fort Craig. Here he befriended Tom Jeffords and became acquainted with notable Apache leaders.

In 1872, Streeter joined General Oliver Otis Howard to negotiate a treaty with Cochise. He was then allegedly hired as the deputy to Harvey Whitehill in Silver City.

== White Apache ==
Streeter later found work as a clerk at the San Carlos Apache Agency in San Carlos, Arizona. He was chastised for providing help to hostile Apache. Streeter claimed he ran afoul with the "Indian Ring" of war profiteers, and subsequently deserted his post and fled to the Chiricahua band of Juh and Geronimo. The Governor of Arizona Territory, Anson P. K. Safford, named Streeter an outlaw and placed a $5,000 bounty on his head. Streeter became a subordinate of Juh and joined him in raiding Mexico and Arizona.

Streeter had become an acquaintance of Vicente Mariscal during the wars with Maximilian. In 1876, Streeter convinced Mariscal, newly Governor of Sonora, to allow the Chiricahua to settle in Mexico after the closure of their reservation. The relationship soured after a few years when the band began raiding with Victorio.

Streeter was noted as leading a band of Apaches in April 1883. He was captured by Mexican forces and taken to Hermosillo, but was released. Streeter continued raiding until the death of Juh later that year.

== Later life and death ==
Streeter was hired by Leonard Wood during his hunt for Geronimo in 1886. In 1889, Streeter was shot and killed in Nacozari, Sonora. He was murdered by the brother of a married woman with whom he was romancing. Streeter was buried with an informal ceremony in Nacozari.

There are claims that Streeter faked his death in order to avoid the bounty on his head. It is claimed that he changed his name to Juan Ramón Holguín and settled down with his family.

== Personal life ==
As an adult, Streeter stood at 5 ft 5 in (1.65 m). He was described as having a "light complexion, grey eyes and auburn hair".

Streeter and his half-brother William Charles "Charley" Streeter were closely associated during their adult lives. Charley was heavily invested in a copper mine in Nacozari.

Streeter had several common-law wives, but no known children. He was most famously married to a daughter of Geronimo, likely Dohn-say. It brought shame on the tribe to acknowledge the relationship, as intermarriage with whites was considered dishonorable. However, Streeter was influential in the band, considered a good warrior, and was well respected.
