= SS Geronimo =

World War II Liberty ship of the United States

History

United States
- Name: Geronimo
- Namesake: Geronimo
- Builder: Permanente Metals Corp., Richmond No. 2 Yard, Richmond, California
- Laid down: 5 May 1943
- Launched: 29 May 1943
- Fate: Scrapped, 1960

General characteristics
- Type: Liberty ship
- Tonnage: 7,000 long tons deadweight (DWT)
- Length: 441 ft 6 in (134.57 m)
- Beam: 56 ft 10.75 in (17.3419 m)
- Draft: 27 ft 9.25 in (8.4646 m)
- Propulsion: 2 × oil-fired boilers; Triple-expansion steam engine, 2,500 hp (1,864 kW); single screw
- Speed: 11.5 knots (21.3 km/h; 13.2 mph)
- Capacity: 9,140 tons cargo
- Complement: 41
- Armament: 1 × 4 in (100 mm) deck gun; Variety of anti-aircraft guns

SS Geronimo (Hull Number 1122) was a Liberty ship built in the United States during World War II. She was named after Geronimo, a Native American warrior who long fought against American settlers in the Old West.

Geronimo was built by Permanente Metals Corp., Richmond No. 2 Yard, Richmond, California. The ship was laid down on 5 May 1943, then launched on 29 May 1943. Geronimo was charter with the Maritime Commission and War Shipping Administration. Geronimo took supplies to Enewetok, Guam, Siapan, Ulithi Atoll, and Okinawa. The ship survived the war only to suffer the same fate as nearly all other Liberty ships; she was scrapped in 1960.

The ship was run by its civilian crew and the US Navy supplied United States Navy Armed Guards to man the deck guns and radio.

== See also ==
- World War II United States Merchant Navy
