= Juh =

Chief of the Nednhi Apache (1825-1883)

Nednhi Apache leader

Personal details
- Born: c. 1825 Arizpe, Sonora, Mexico
- Died: September/October 1883 (aged 57–58) near Casas Grandes, Chihuahua
- Cause of death: Heart attack
- Resting place: Aros River, Chihuahua, Mexico
- Spouse: Ishton
- Relations: Geronimo (cousin and brother-in-law)
- Children: Asa Daklugie, Delzhinne, Daklegon
- Mother tongue: Chiricahua
- Nickname: Tan-Dɨn-Bɨl-No-Jui

Military service
- Battles/wars: Apache-Mexico Wars

Juh (c. 1825 – Sept/Oct 1883) was a warrior and leader of the Janeros local group of the Ndéndai (or Nednhi) band of the Chiricahua Apache. Prior to the 1870s, Juh was unknown in the areas controlled by the United States. He went to war together with the Tchihende leader Mangas Coloradas and Tsokanende leader Cochise, and was particularly close to the Bedonkohe di-yin and leader Geronimo.

== Tribal background ==
The home range of the Janeros Nednhi was usually in the remote wilderness of the Sierra Madre Occidental of northern Mexico. This range was referred to as "Blue Mountains" by the Apache, therefore they likely called themselves Dzilthdaklizhéndé - "Blue Mountain People".

They constituted the northern local group of the Nednhi and lived from the Animas Mountains and Florida Mountains in southwestern New Mexico, south into the Sierra del Tigre, Sierra San Luis, Sierra de Carcay, Sierra de Boca Grande, west beyond the Aros River to Bavispe in northeastern Sonora, and east along the Janos River and Casas Grandes River toward the Lake Guzmán in the northern part of the Guzmán Basin in northwestern Chihuahua.

They were named Janeros after the town Janos in northern Chihuahua, with which they were usually at peace and traded their goods (often stolen in neighboring Sonora).

== Biography ==
=== Killing of Howard B. Cushing ===
Historians believe that Juh planned and executed an 1871 attack in which Lt. Howard Bass Cushing was killed, in the Whetstone Mountains of southern Arizona. A noted U.S. Army Indian fighter, Cushing had made disparaging comments about Cochise that offended Apache sensibilities, and he relentlessly pursued the Apaches (specifically Cochise) around southern Arizona and northern Sonora. At the same time, Cushing became a focus of Juh's attention. The ambush and fight in which he was killed may have been intended to teach him a lesson. It was widely thought at the time that Cochise was himself responsible for the planning and execution of the battle, but a description of the Apache leader does not match eyewitness accounts, including the observation that the Apache leader didn't speak much, but directed his fighters with gestures and hand signals during the battle. The Apache leader most closely matching the physical and behavioral description was Juh. Dan Thrapp made this observation in his book The Conquest of Apacheria. Later, the fact was confirmed by Asa Daklugie (Juh's son) in Eve Ball's (1980) book about the Chiricahuas, Indeh.

=== Death ===
Juh died on September 21, 1883, while trying to cross the Aros River near Casas Grandes, Chihuahua. Accounts of his death vary, and some contemporary sources were skeptical of the report, saying "dispatches have Juh the Apache chief killed again." One version is that he was drunk and fell off his horse, breaking his neck. His son Asa Daklugie said that he was not drunk, but after trading ammunition from Casas Grandes he had a heart attack, fell off his horse as a result and died before a physician could arrive to help him. Other sources and local stories claim that Juh fell fatally into the river while trying to jump off a cliff with his horse. After his death, the surviving son of Mangas Coloradas took care of his family, and was the last Apache chief to surrender. Juh was buried by his sons and his band on the bank of the river.

== Personal life ==
Juh was referred to by various names, including Ju, Ho, Whoa, Woah, and sometimes Who, Why, How. His name reportedly meant "He Sees Ahead" or "Long Neck". He was also known as Tan-Dɨn-Bɨl-No-Jui - "He Brings Many Things With Him" or Ya-Natch-Cln - "See Far".

Most descriptions focused on Juh being a very large and stocky man. He stood over six feet and weighed 225 pounds. Juh was a natural leader, and had a stutter. Because of this, Geronimo often acted as a conduit for Juh's words.

Some sources say he was Geronimo's cousin. They grew up together even though they were from different bands. He married Ishton, who was Geronimo's sister, and had a son with her who was later known as Asa Daklugie. He also had two other sons, named Delzhinne and Daklegon.

== See also ==
- Zebina Streeter, subordinate of Juh known as "White Apache"
