= Jesús García =

Mexican national hero (1881–1907)

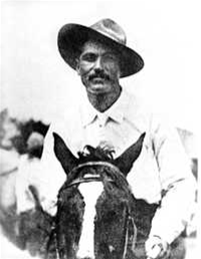
- García riding a horse days before his death
- Born: Jesús García Corona; 13 November 1881; Hermosillo, Sonora, Mexico
- Died: 7 November 1907 (aged 25); Nacozari, Sonora, Mexico
- Cause of death: Died in a dynamite explosion to prevent a mass casualty event
- Occupation: Railroader
- Years active: 1898–1907

Jesús García Corona (13 November 1881 – 7 November 1907) was a Mexican railroad brakeman who died while preventing a train loaded with dynamite from exploding near Nacozari, Sonora, in 1907. As "el héroe de Nacozari", he is revered as a national hero and many streets, plazas, and schools across Mexico are named after him.

García was born on 13 November 1881, in Hermosillo, Sonora. He was one of eight children. At the age of 17 he got a job with Moctezuma Copper Company, but due to his age, he was made a water boy. He was promoted to switchman, then to brakeman, and eventually to fireman.

García was the railroad brakeman for the train that covered the line between Nacozari, Sonora, and Douglas, Arizona. On 7 November 1907, the train was stopped in the town and, as he was resting, he saw that some hay on the roof of a car containing dynamite had caught fire. The cause of the fire was that the locomotive's smokebox was failing and sparks were going out from the smokestack. The wind blew them and got into the dynamite cars. García drove the train in reverse downhill at full-steam six kilometers out of the town before the dynamite exploded, killing him but sparing the townspeople.

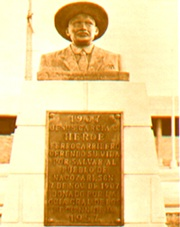
Monument to Jesús García in Nacozari

In his honor a statue was raised and the name of the town of Nacozari was changed to Nacozari de García. He was declared Hero of Humanity by the American Red Cross, many streets in Mexico carry his name, and the Estadio Héroe de Nacozari sports stadium in Hermosillo is also named after him. García's sacrifice is remembered in the corrido (ballad) "Máquina 501", sung by Pancho "el Charro" Avitia, and Mexican railroad workers commemorate 7 November every year as the Día del Ferrocarrilero (Railroader's Day). His heroism is also recounted in the ballad, "Jesus Garcia" sung by Arizona State's official balladeer, Dolan Ellis, who wanted to let the world know of the "Casey Jones of Mexico" who saved the town. García was awarded, posthumously, the American Cross of Honor.

The "Máquina 501" song in free translation:

Engine 501
rolls through Sonora.
And the brakeman
who won't sigh will cry.

One fine Sunday, gentlemen,
'round three o'clock,
Jesús Garcia sweetly
caressed his mother.

"Soon I must depart,
kind mother,
the train whistle
draws the future near."

Arriving at the station
a whistle blew shrill.
The wagon with dynamite
menaced with its roof afire.

The fireman says,
"Jesús, let's scram!
that wagon behind
will burn us to hell."

Jesús replies,
"That I cannot own –
this conflagration
will kill the whole town!"

So he throws it in reverse
to escape downhill
and by the sixth mile
into God's hands he'd arrived.

From that unforgettable day
you've earned the holy cross
you've earned our applause.
Jesús, you're our hero.

Engine 501
rolls through Sonora.
And the brakeman
who won't sigh will cry.
