= Cerro Verde mine =

Mine in Peru

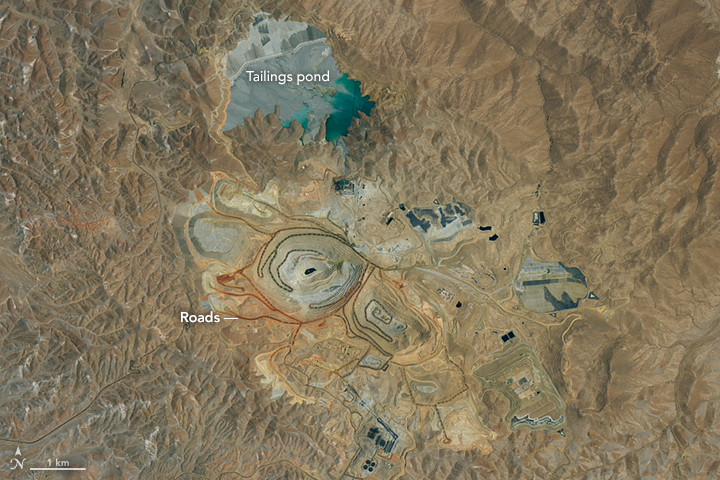
- Cerro Verde mine from space, 2016

Location
- Location: Arequipa Region, Peru

Production
- Products: Copper, Molybdenum

Owner
- Company: Freeport-McMoran 53.5%, Sumitomo Metal Mining 21%
- Website: Cerro Verde Mine

The Cerro Verde mine is a very large copper mine located about 20 miles southwest of Arequipa, in southwestern Peru. Cerro Verde represents one of the largest copper reserves in Peru and in the world, having estimated reserves of 4.63 billion tonnes of ore grading 0.4% copper and 113.2 million oz of silver.

In 2014, The Bank of Tokyo-Mitsubishi UFJ and other lenders gave a 5-year US$1.8 billion unsecured loan for a major expansion of Cerro Verde. Total projected capital cost of the project was US$4.4 billion. The expansion of the mine and mill was completed in 2015. Cerro Verde will be able to produce approximately 1.0 billion pounds of copper and 23 million pounds of molybdenum per year, which would place the mine among the top five copper producers in the world.

Current (2015) ownership is Freeport 53.5%, Sumitomo Metal Mining 21%, and Peruvian investors 25.5%

== History ==
In the 1800s, Spaniards mined high-grade oxide copper ore from Cerro Verde. Anaconda Copper owned the property from 1916 until 1970, when the mine was expropriated by the Peruvian government. The government mined Cerro Verde’s oxide ores and built one of the world’s first SX/EW facilities in 1972. Cyprus Amax purchased the operation in 1994 and upgraded it. In late 1999, Cyprus-Amax was acquired by Phelps Dodge, which in turn was acquired by Freeport-McMoRan in 2007.

== Economic geology ==
Cerro Verde is a very large porphyry copper deposit, that has oxide and secondary sulfide mineralization, above primary sulfide mineralization. The main oxide copper minerals are brochantite, chrysocolla, malachite and copper “pitch.” Chalcocite and covellite are the most important secondary enrichment copper sulfide minerals. Chalcopyrite and molybdenite are the dominant primary sulfides.

== See also ==
- List of mines in Peru
- Toquepala mine
