= Largest gold companies =

List of the largest gold mining companies by output and market value

Gold mining companies can be ranked by various metrics, including annual production, cash costs per ounce, and market capitalization. The most common rankings are based on either total gold output (in ounces) or market capitalization, which reflects the total value of a company’s outstanding shares.

As of 2024, the world’s top 10 largest gold producers by output included US-based Newmont Corporation, Canada-based Barrick Gold, Russia-based Polyus, China-based Zijin Mining. China remains the top gold-producing country, followed by Russia, Australia, Canada, and the United States.

While global gold production peaked around 2018–2019, recent years have seen stable but slightly declining output, largely due to resource depletion in mature mining regions and increased production costs.

== Ranking ==
The following are the world’s largest publicly reporting gold mining companies by production in 2024, measured in million ounces. This ranking is based on Bloomberg and company disclosures. Figures for China National Gold Group and Navoi Mining and Metallurgical Company are excluded due to limited public reporting, though both are believed to be major global producers, with Navoi's output estimated at approximately 2.86 million ounces (88.9 tonnes) in 2024 and China Gold contributing significantly to China’s national production of around 370 tonnes.

Top Gold Mining Companies by 2024 Production (million ounces)
Rank	Company	Country	Production (million ounces)
1	Newmont	United States	6.7
2	Barrick Gold	Canada	3.9
3	Agnico Eagle Mines	Canada	3.5
4	Polyus	Russia	3.0
5=	AngloGold Ashanti	South Africa	2.6
5=	Zijin Mining	China	2.6
7	Gold Fields	South Africa	2.1
8	Kinross Gold	Canada	2.1
9	Freeport-McMoRan	United States	1.9
10	Northern Star Resources	Australia	1.6

== Forbes Global 2000 ==
The Forbes Global 2000 is an annual ranking of the world's largest public companies published by Forbes magazine. Companies are ranked based on a composite score of revenue, profit, assets, and market value. While not exclusively ranked by size or gold output, it remains one of the most widely cited measures of corporate scale.

As of the 2024 list, the following gold and gold-related mining companies were included:

Gold-related companies in the Forbes Global 2000 (2024)
Rank (Global)	Company	Country	Revenue (US$ billion)	Profit (US$ billion)	Assets (US$ billion)	Market Value (US$ billion)
267	Zijin Mining Group	China	40.22	3.06	49.24	63.25
353	Freeport-McMoRan	United States	23.81	1.64	54.2	77.9
597	Barrick Gold	Canada	11.49	1.45	45.84	31.4
784	Newmont	United States	13.12	-2.67	55.34	50.44
1102	Agnico Eagle Mines	Canada	6.95	0.47	28.8	35.0
1648	Gold Fields	South Africa	4.5	0.70	8.23	14.46
1737	Shandong Gold Mining	China	8.36	0.25	19.04	10.64

Several gold-focused companies that previously appeared in earlier editions, such as Goldcorp, AngloGold Ashanti, Newcrest Mining, and Yamana Gold, have either been acquired or dropped from the list due to changes in size, profitability, or corporate restructuring. For example, Goldcorp was acquired by Newmont in 2019, and Yamana was acquired by Pan American Silver and Agnico Eagle in 2023.

== See also ==
- Largest copper companies
