= Asa Daklugie =

Chief of the Nedni Apaches

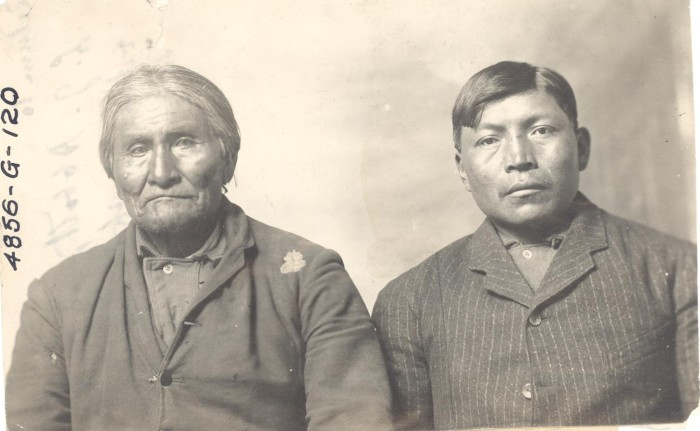
Geronimo (left) and Asa Daklugie

Asa Daklugie (born abt. 1869-1955) was a Chief of the Nedni Apaches, the Southern Band of the Chiricahua, son to Juh and nephew to Geronimo.

His father was an Apache Chief, Juh, and his mother was Ishton. Another close relative to Daklugie was his uncle Geronimo.

== Early years ==
Daklugie served as Geronimo's official interpreter when interacting with non-native people. He was raised in the Chiricahua Apache religion and never wavered even when many Indians converted to Christianity. As he grew older, he still preserves the knowledge of this religion from the outsiders to keep it from the American world. Daklugie, following closely in the beliefs of Geronimo believed in God the Apache called Ussen, who was the "Creator of Life." It has been recorded that Ussen gave Geronimo courage and visions about what were to happen in the future.

Daklugie traveled all around the States after the death of his father. These places include Mexico, Fort Pickens and back to Carlisle. He was also responsible for the movement of the Apache into new territory different from where they were originally located at.

=== Carlisle Indian School ===
Daklugie was taken to the Carlisle Indian School in Carlisle, Pennsylvania on December 8, 1886 as a prisoner of war. He was discharged from the school on November 7, 1895. He was there from the ages 12–17.

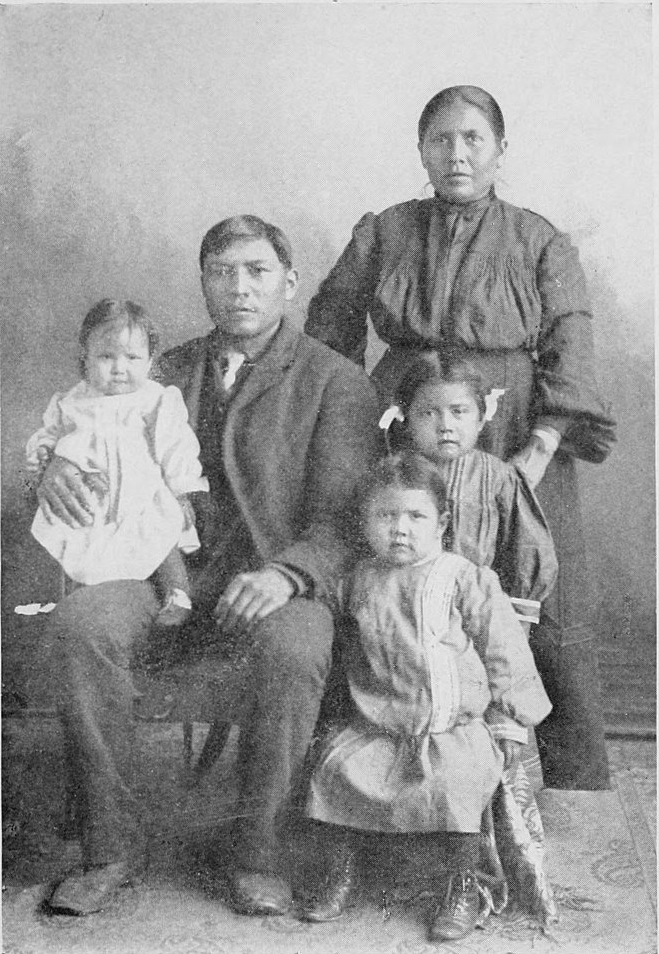
Asa Daklugie with his wife Ramona Daklugie and first 3 children, Maude, Sarah and Lydia.

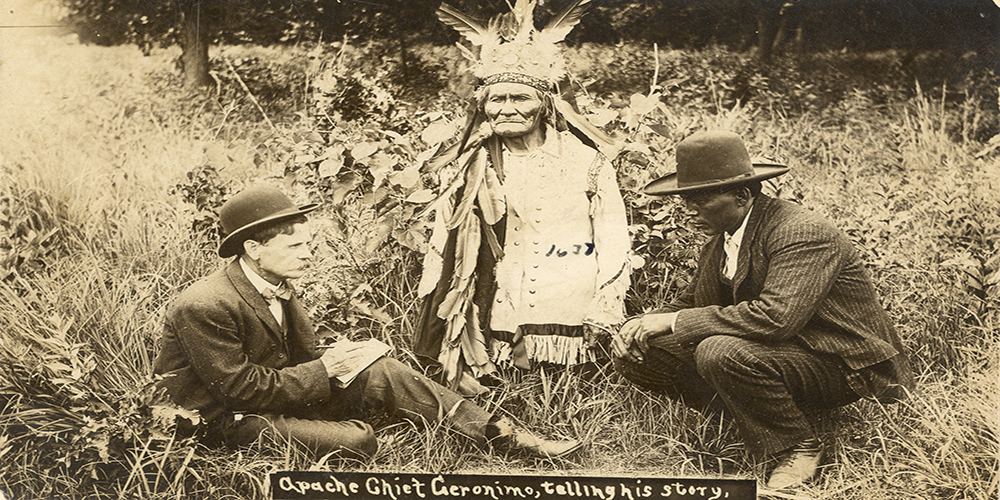
Asa Daklugie (right) assisting Geronimo (middle) and Steven Melvil Barret (left) in communication by acting as a translator.

At this Indian school, the intention was to assimilate the Indian children into American society. The boys and girls were dressed up in "trousers, skirts and jackets... and given American names" [once they moved like the wind]. This is how Daklugie got the name Asa. They weren't allowed to speak their native dialect either; the U.S government wanted to remove any trace of their native culture so they would have no other option but to learn the white ways of life. Daklugie was at the head of the boys class, and as the names were given out in alphabetical order, this resulted in his being given a name starting with an "A". They also estimated the birth dates of the children brought to the school for records.

Some activities done at the school included learning to read, write and speak English, household chores, learning to play the drums, gym class, farming, milking cows, and there were some outdoor activities for the kids to do. There were sports teams at Carlisle and Daklugie was on the track team. He also showed interest in the maps while talking with his teachers at Carlisle and wasn't scolded when talking about it in their native language. Daklugie and his classmate George Martine read many books, including books about their people from the library. The activities done here at the Carlisle Indian School was training the children for their future settlement in Mescalera.

Here he met his wife, Ramona Chihuahua Daklugie and went on to have nine children with her. Two of these children, Maude and Sarah Daklugie were later enrolled into the same school as their father.

== Later years ==
After leaving the Carlisle Indian School, Daklugie moved to Fort Sill to reunite with his family. Later in his life, he bought a ranch to live at with his family after having his freedom granted.

Asa Daklugie was involved in the Apache Wars, and during that time he was captured as a prisoner of war for 25 years.

He also served as a translator for Steven Melvil Barret's book Geronimo: His Own Story.
