= Southern Copper Corporation =

Mining company

- Type: Public company
- Traded as: BVL: SCCO; NYSE: SCCO; Russell 1000 Component
- Industry: Mining
- Founded: 1952; 74 years ago
- Headquarters: Phoenix, Arizona
- Key people: Oscar González Rocha (CEO)
- Products: Copper; Molybdenum; Zinc; Silver
- Revenue: ▲US$11.433 billion (2024)
- Net income: ▲US$3.376 billion (2024)
- Total assets: ▲US$18.713 billion (2024)
- Total equity: ▲US$9.238 billion (2024)
- Owner: Grupo México (88.9%)
- Number of employees: 16,133 (2024)
- Website: www.southerncoppercorp.com

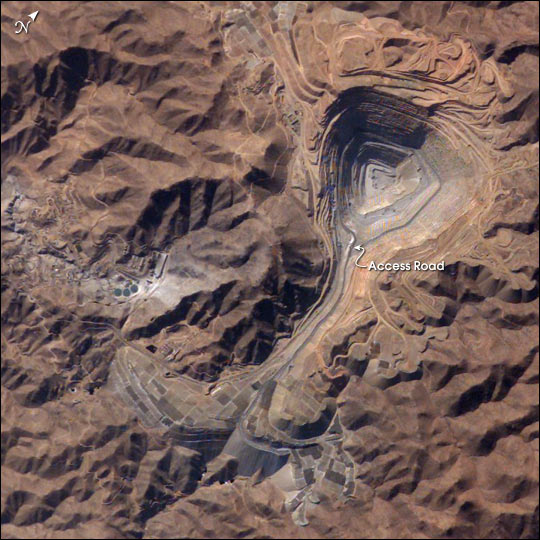
The Toquepala mine in 2003, viewed from the International Space Station. The open pit was then 2.5 kilometers across.

Southern Copper Corporation, organized in Delaware and headquartered in Phoenix, Arizona, owns copper mines, smelters, and refineries in Peru and Mexico, including the Cuajone mine, the Toquepala mine, and the Tia Maria mine in Peru and the Buenavista mine and the La Caridad Mine in Mexico. In 2024, the company mined 2.1 billion pounds of copper, 21 million ounces of silver, 64 million pounds of molybdenum, and 286 million pounds of zinc.

The company is 88.9% owned by Grupo México.

== History ==
The company was founded in 1952 as a joint venture between ASARCO and Newmont. In 1955, Edward McL. Tittmann was named president and CEO and the company received a $100 million loan from the Export–Import Bank of the United States to fund the Toquepala mine.

It began copper mining operations in 1960. In 1976, it opened the Cuajone mine, with a minority interest owned by Billiton.

In 1995, ASARCO acquired an additional 10% of the company from Newmont for $116.4 million, raising its stake to 63%. Southern Copper became a public company in January 1996 after a reorganization. In 1999, Grupo México acquired ASARCO and became the majority owner of Southern Copper.

In April 2005, the company acquired Grupo Minera in Mexico from Grupo México for $3.75 billion. In October 2005, it changed its name from Southern Peru to Southern Copper Corporation. In 2011, a court ruled that the price of Grupo Minera was unfair and Grupo Mexico was forced to return $1.3 billion in shares to Southern Copper. In November 2011, Grupo México cancelled plans to merge Southern Copper with ASARCO after shareholder dissent.

From 2007 to 2010, intermittent strike actions at the Buenavista mine disrupted production; union members even threatened to blow up the mine.
