= La Caridad Mine =

Copper mine in Nacozari, Sonora, Mexico

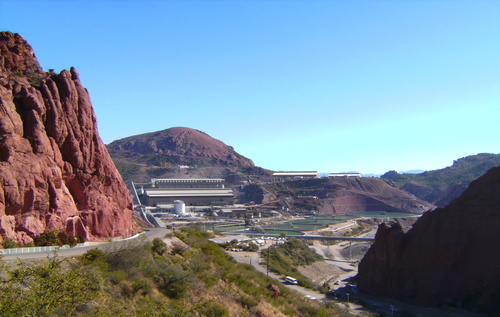
- Photo of the mine taken in 2007.

- Location within Sonora Location within Mexico
- Location: Nacozari, Sonora, Mexico; 30°19′16″N 109°33′23″W
- Products: Copper
- Company: Grupo México

La Caridad Mine is a large open-pit copper mine in Nacozari, Sonora, Mexico. It is operated by Mexicana de Cobre, S.A., which is a part of Grupo México, the largest copper producer in Mexico. The mine lies approximately 8 mi (13 km) east of Nacozari de Garcia.

Although the mine was worked in the 1800s, it was closed about 1948, and did not reopen until 1979.

In 1985 the mine was producing over 72,000 metric tons of ore per day. In addition to copper, it produced silver as a byproduct, in 1995 that amounted to over 77 tons of silver. The mine was repurchased by investors from the Mexican government in 1988. The mine employed approximately 3,000 workers in 2000. In 2006 the mine was shut down due to labor strikes.

== See also ==
- Buenavista mine
