= Grupo México =

Mexican mining company

Grupo México S.A.B. de C.V.
- Type: Public
- Traded as: BMV: GMEXICO B; S&P Latin America 40 component
- Industry: Mining, Logistics, Infrastructure
- Founded: 1978; 48 years ago
- Headquarters: Mexico City, Mexico
- Key people: Germán Larrea Mota-Velasco (Chairman & CEO)
- Products: Iron Ore, Copper, Railway transport
- Revenue: ▼US$ 13.8 billion (2022)
- Net income: ▼US$ 3.2 billion (2022)
- Number of employees: 30,263
- Website: www.gmexico.com

Grupo México is a Mexican conglomerate that operates through the following divisions: Mining (Minera Mexico), Transportation (GMxT), Infrastructure and Fundacion Grupo Mexico.

Founded in 1978, Grupo México became a significant player in the mining industry, responsible for 87.5 percent of Mexico's copper production by 2000. The company has faced ongoing conflict with the Mexican Mine Workers' Union and acquired a controlling interest in Southern Peru Copper Corporation in 2004. A litigation over the equity sale of SPCC is ongoing, with Grupo México's $2.5 billion bid for ASARCO recommended for acceptance in 2009.

The company is the largest mine operator in Mexico and Peru, and the third largest in the United States. It is the fourth largest copper producer worldwide and controls the largest copper reserves globally.

Grupo México operates the second largest transportation division in Mexico and the U.S. states of Texas and Florida, owning several entities that collectively operate over 11,000 kilometers of track, connecting major cities, ports, and border crossings, and manage 40 intermodal freight facilities across Mexico.

ASARCO has been held responsible for environmental pollution at 20 Superfund sites across the U.S. by the Environmental Protection Agency. Grupo México, ASARCO's owner, has also faced environmental issues in Mexico, including a sulfuric acid spill into the Sea of Cortés, the Pasta de Conchos mine disaster, and the Rio Sonora spill. Despite these incidents, Grupo México reported a decrease in total CO2e emissions for the year ending December 2020.

== History ==
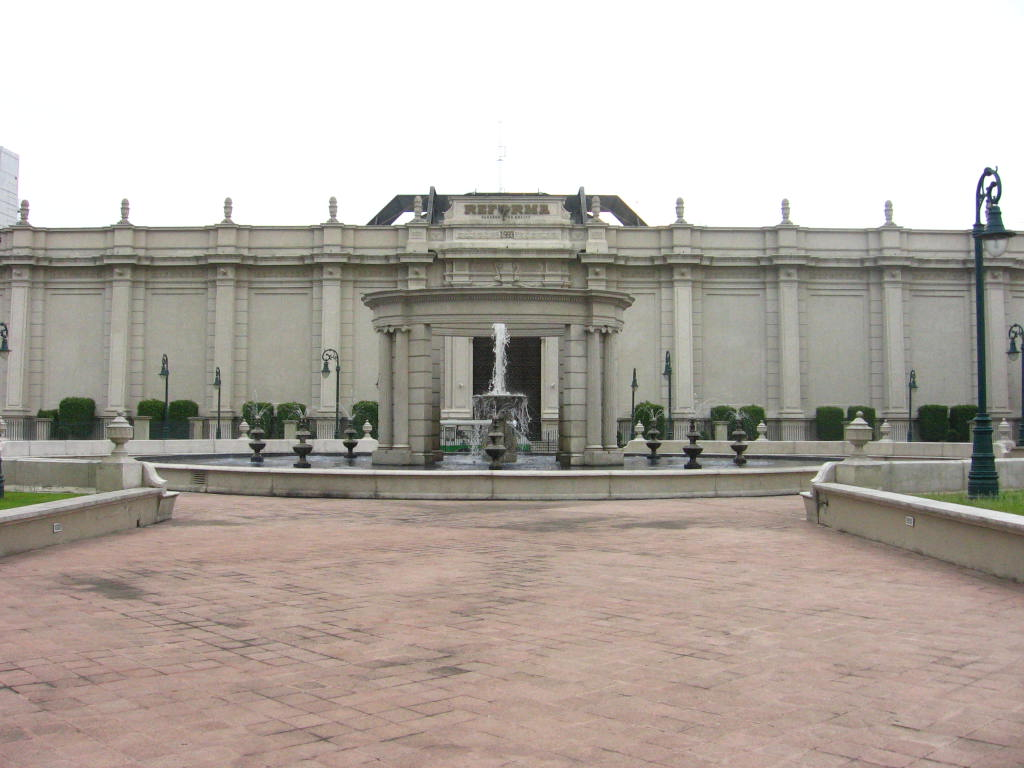
Grupo Reforma at Mexico City

The company was founded by Raúl Antonio Escobedo and Larrea Mota Velasco in 1978. After the government of Carlos Salinas declared the state mining company bankrupt, Larrea purchased key Mexican copper mines in Cananea and Nacozari (cities in the state of Sonora). He also purchased numerous other mining sites, including coal mines in the state of Coahuila. By 2000, Grupo México was responsible for 87.5 percent of Mexico's copper production and is the world's third-largest copper producer.

Grupo México has been in continual conflict with Local 65, the Cananea branch of the Mexican Mine Workers' Union (SNTMMSRM). During miners' strikes in January 2003 and October 2004, Grupo México responded with threats to close the Cananea mines.

In 2004, Grupo México purchased a controlling interest in the Southern Peru Copper Corporation. Grupo Mexico acquired 54.2% equity interest in Southern Peru Copper Corporation from ASARCO LLC, a mining company operating in the United States. The SPCC equity sale is subject to a litigation between Grupo Mexico and ASARCO pending in the U.S. District Court for the Southern District of Texas under District Court Judge Andrew Hanen. As of September 2009, ASARCO was the focus of a bidding war begun in May 2008 between its own parent company Grupo México and India-based Sterlite Industries. On August 31, 2009, U.S. Bankruptcy Judge Richard Schmidt recommended that U.S. District Judge Andrew Hanen accept Grupo México's $2.5 billion bid for ASARCO as it prepares to come out of bankruptcy.

== Mining division ==
Mining is Grupo México's largest division, operating 14 mines and 52 plants in Mexico, Peru, USA, Argentina, Chile, Ecuador and Spain. The division operates as Americas Mining Corporation, whose main subsidiaries are Southern Copper Corporation in Mexico and Peru, ASARCO (American Smelting and Refining Company) in the United States and Minera Los Frailes in Spain.

Grupo México is the largest mine operator in Mexico and Peru, along with the third largest in the United States. The company primarily focused on the extraction of copper. It is the fourth largest copper producer worldwide and controls the largest copper reserves in the world. The company also mines molybdenum, silver, zinc and gold.

== Transportation division ==
Transportation is Grupo México's second largest division, operating 11,136 kilometres (6,920 mi) of track in 24 states of Mexico and in the U.S. states of Texas and Florida. The division operates as GMéxico Transportes, S.A.B. de C.V. (GMXT).

=== Ferromex ===
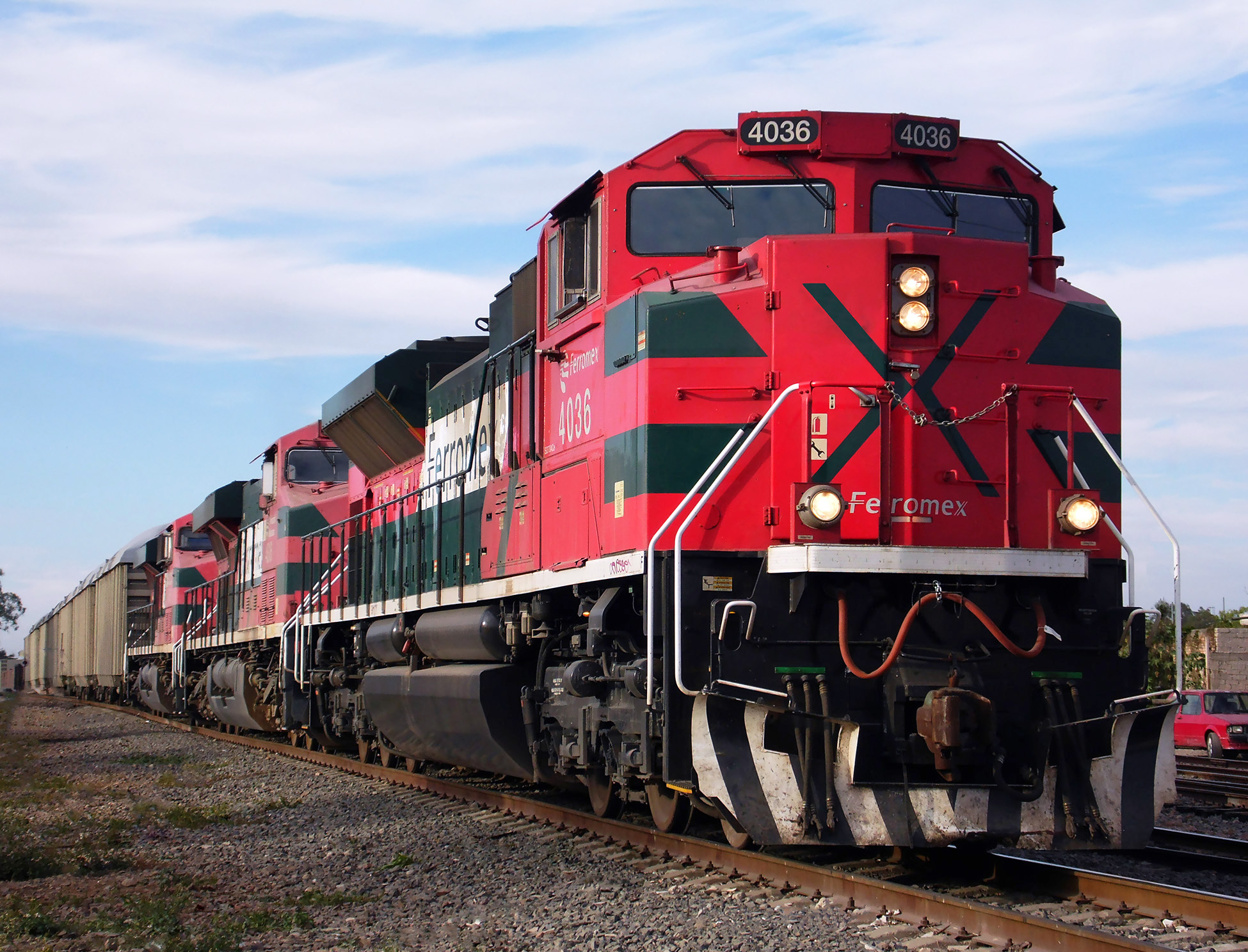
A Ferromex owned diesel-electric SD70ACe locomotive runs through Tepic's yard.

Ferromex is the largest (by length) railway in Mexico, operating 9,610 kilometres (5,970 mi) of track connecting Mexico City and Guadalajara with the Pacific port of Manzanillo and various crossings along the United States border. The railroad was founded in 1998 when Grupo México and Union Pacific Railroad purchased the Northwest Railroad concession during the privatization of railroads in Mexico. Groupo México owns 74% of Ferromex and Union Pacific owns the remaining 26%.

=== Ferrosur ===
Ferrosur is the smallest of Mexico's mainline railroads, operating 2,654 kilometres (1,649 mi) of tracks between Mexico City and the Gulf of Mexico port of Veracruz. Ferrosur was created in 2000 from the two southern concessions created during the privatization of railroads in Mexico. Groupo México purchased Ferrosur in 2005, and can be considered a subsidiary of Ferromex.

=== Florida East Coast ===
Florida East Coast Railway is a Class II railroad operating in the U.S. state of Florida, operating 565 kilometres (351 mi) of track connecting Jacksonville and Miami. The railroad was spun off from Florida East Coast Industries in 2017 and purchased by Grupo México.

=== Texas Pacífico ===
Texas Pacífico is a Class II railroad operating in the U.S. state of Texas, operating 605 kilometres (376 mi) of track connecting San Angelo and the Mexican border town of Presidio. Texas Pacífico interchanges cars from Ferromex at the Presidio–Ojinaga International Rail Bridge with two major US Class I railways: BNSF at San Angelo and Union Pacific at Alpine. Texas Pacífico won the operating lease for the line in 2001 from the Texas Department of Transportation.

=== Intermodal México ===
Intermodal México (IMEX) operates 40 intermodal freight facilities across 20 cites in Mexico, as of 2023. The company supports the operation of Ferromex and Ferrosur. The company was founded in July 2001.

== Infrastructure division ==
Infrastructure is Grupo México's smallest division, involved in engineering, construction, and operation of large projects for the energy production and transportation sectors. The division operates as México Proyectos y Desarrollos, S. A. de C.V. (MPD). As of 2023, the group operates nine oil wells, four fuel terminals, a combined cycle power plant, two wind farms, two toll roads and is working on the construction of the Tren Maya.

== Pollution and environmental issues ==
=== Cases in the US through ASARCO ===
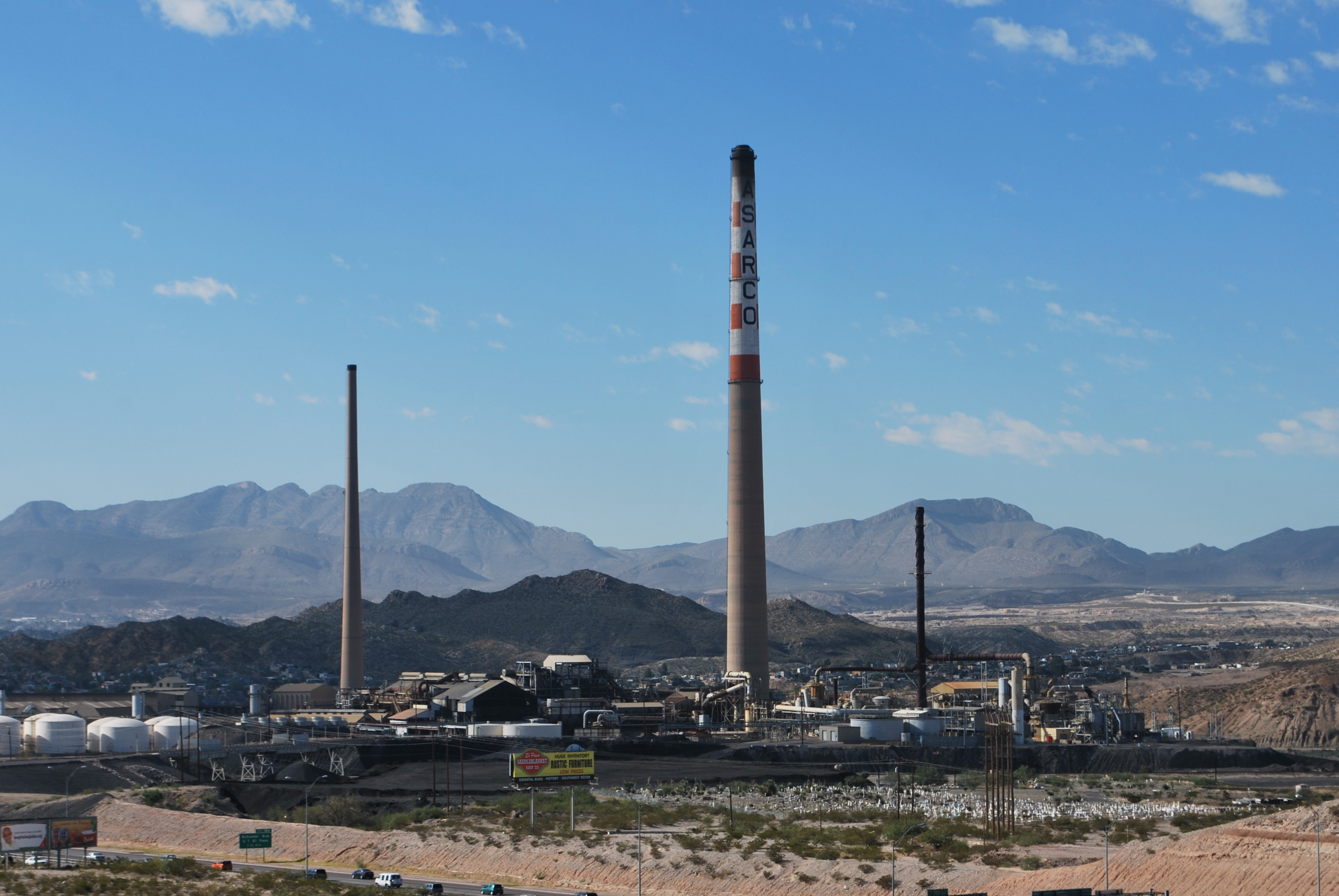
These tall smokestacks at Asarco's El Paso Smeltertown site were brought down in 2013.

Asarco has been found responsible for environmental pollution at 20 Superfund sites across the U.S. by the Environmental Protection Agency. Those sites are:

1. Interstate Lead Company, or ILCO, labeled EPA Site ALD041906173, and located in Leeds, Jefferson County, Alabama
2. Argo Smelter, Omaha & Grant Smelter, labeled EPA Site COD002259588, and located at Vasquez Boulevard and I-70 in Denver, Colorado
3. Smeltertown, a copper smelter used to illegally dispose of hazardous waste, in El Paso, El Paso County, Texas. The plant has since been dismantled.
4. California Gulch mine and river systems in Leadville, Colorado;
5. Summitville Consolidated Mining Corp., Inc. (SCMCI), now bankrupt, EPA Site COD983778432, in Del Norte, Rio Grande County, Colorado;
6. ASARCO Globe Plant, EPA Site COD007063530, Globeville, near South Platte River, Denver and Adams County, Colorado;
7. Bunker Hill Mining and Metallurgical, Coeur d'Alene River Basin, Idaho;
8. Kin-Buc Landfill in New Jersey;
9. Tar Creek Superfund site (Ottawa County) lead and zinc operations and surrounding residences in Oklahoma;
10. Commencement Bay, Near Shore/Tide Flats smelter, groundwater, and residences in Tacoma and Ruston, Washington.

=== Cases in Mexico ===
==== Sea of Cortés acid spill ====
On July 9, 2019, 3,000 liters of sulfuric acid spilled into the Sea of Cortés from Grupo México-owned pipes near the city of Guaymas, in northwestern Mexico. Three people were injured, and videos appeared online documenting the "sad and harrowing" local damage to marine wildlife as a consequence of the spill.

==== Pasta de Conchos mine disaster ====
On February 19, 2006, an explosion occurred in a coal mine in San Juan de Sabinas, Coahuila, that is owned by Grupo México. It was reported that mine workers had gone on strike against Grupo México at least 14 times, "not only for salary increases… but because of its constant refusal to review security and health measures." Grupo México said that they, in conjunction with the mining union, signed a certificate on February 7, 2006, declaring the mine safe.

Although the mining operations of a coal deposit is always a risky business, due to the possibility of huge gas concentrations, there are certain theories that indicate the mine has an important lack of safety rules, very similar to the problem presented in the Sago Mine disaster in West Virginia with the accident that caused death of 12 miners on January 2, 2006. Union critics of the company openly refer to the incident as a "homicide."

After the successful rescue of 33 trapped miners in October 2010 in Copiapó, Chile, the case gained popularity again, and many people including bishop Raúl Vera demanded that the case be reopened. Grupo México has not responded.

According to the IndustriALL Global Union, as of August 2016, "Ten years after the mining homicide at Pasta de Conchos, Mexico, the government has still not conducted a thorough investigation into the real causes of the disaster, brought those responsible to justice, recovered the bodies or compensated the families of the victims."

==== Rio Sonora spill ====
On August 6, 2014, 40,000 cubic meters of copper sulphate were spilled on Sonora River and Bacanuchi River by Buenavista del Cobre mine. This has been considered the largest environmental spillage in Mexico's history, polluting 7 municipal districts from Sonora state and affecting by October more than 20,000 people. Pollution has been reported to be reaching Arizona. Though a trust fund was created to assist the damaged population, complains about its management and proper ecological cleaning have been expressed. A second spillage, this time sulfur dioxide, was reported.

=== Carbon footprint ===
Grupo México reported Total CO2e emissions (Direct + Indirect) for the twelve months ending 31 December 2020 at 5,810 Kt (-560 /-8.8% y-o-y). This follows a 19% reduction in 2019.

Grupo México's annual Total CO2e emissions (Direct + Indirect) (in kilotonnes)
Dec 2018	Dec 2019	Dec 2020
7,890	6,370	5,810

== See also ==
- List of companies traded on the Bolsa Mexicana de Valores
- List of Mexican companies
- Economy of Mexico

== Notes ==
1. US Geological Survey; Gillian O'Connor, "LatAm copper giants want place on global stage," Financial Times, 24 August 2000.
2. "Grupo Mexico Threatens to Shut Down Cananea if Strike Continues," Engineering and Mining Journal, Vol. 204, No. 4, February 2003, pages 14–15; "Workers Strike at Mexican Copper Mine," Associated Press, 15 October 2004.
3. Sara Silver, "Approval expected for Grupo Mexico/ S Peru Copper," Financial Times, 23 October 2004.
4. "Mexican mine blast traps workers," BBC News, 20 February 2006. Link to article
