= Quellaveco mine =

Mine in Peru

Coordinates: 17.1043°S 70.6199°W

- Interactive map of Quellaveco mine
- Location: Moquegua Region, Peru
- Products: Copper
- Production: 300,000 tonnes
- Opened: 2022
- Company: Anglo American

The Quellaveco mine is a large copper mine project located in the south of Peru in the Moquegua Region. It is undergoing government environment approvals for its Environmental Impact Assessment. The last EIA modification was submitted in 2014. The Quellaveco mining property is majority–owned by Anglo American. Quellaveco represents one of the largest copper reserves in Peru and in the world, having estimated reserves of 1.1 billion tonnes of ore grading 0.55% copper. The planned development of the mine estimates a processing capacity of 85000 metric tonnes per day. Fluor Corporation has been assigned as the EPCM contractor for this project.

The mine is due to begin production in 2022 after an investment of approximately $5bn. In late 2019 it was reported the mine was 34% complete and was on schedule. However, during the COVID-19 pandemic in 2020, a three-month hold was declared on the project with a reduction in Capital expenditure for that year in the order of $300 million. By late 2020 it was reported that 15,000 staff were working on the site and the project was due to recover from the shut-down and still enter production in 2022 with a prediction of 330,000 tonnes of copper a year for the first five years. In 2021 the first of three Caterpillar Inc. 7495 electric Rope shovels was completed on the site. The project intends to pair the 7495s with a fleet of 30 Caterpillar 794 AC Autonomous haul trucks.

Production at the site started in 2022 with a steady ramp-up reaching its nameplate capacity in 2023, producing 300,000 tonnes of copper annually. With output for 2025 expected to reach between 310,000 and 340,000 tonnes.

== Geology ==
The porphyry copper deposit and hypogene mineralization occurred in the Early Eocene. Supergene sulfide enrichment began in the Late Oligocene and continued until the Early Miocene. Chalcocite is the more common copper ore mineral as massive assemblages.

== See also ==
- Toquepala mine
- Cuajone mine
- Yanacocha
- Cerro de Pasco
- List of mines in Peru
