= Bacanuchi River =

River of Mexico

Coordinates: 30°20′38″N 110°09′22″W

The Bacanuchi River (Spanish: Río Bacanuchi) is a river of Mexico in the northern part of the Sonora River basin, and a tributary of the Sonora River. Its drainage basin has an area of 1431 square kilometers.

In August 2014, a Grupo México copper mine spilled 10 million gallons of acidified copper sulfate solution into the Bacanuchi River. María Luisa Albores González, the head of Mexico's Environment Department, described the incident as "the most serious environmental disaster in the history of metal mining in Mexico."
