= Nacozari de García =

Mining town in northeast Sonora, Mexico

- City and Municipality
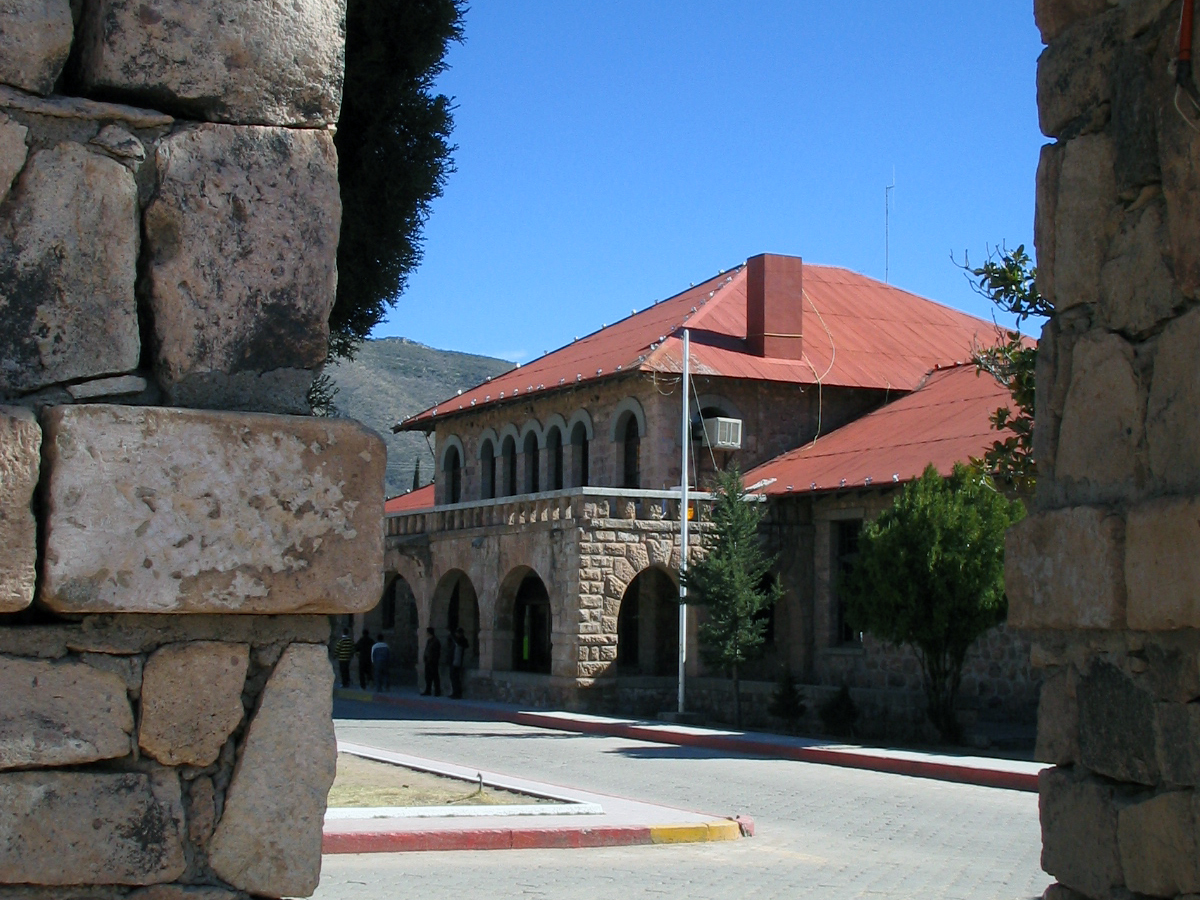
- Municipal Palace

- Location within Sonora Location within Mexico
- Coordinates: 30°23′N 109°41′W
- Country: Mexico
- State: Sonora
- Time zone: UTC-7 (Zona Pacífico)

Nacozari de García is a small mining town in the northeast of the Mexican state of Sonora. It serves as the municipal seat for the surrounding municipality of the same name.

== Geography ==
The municipal seat had a population of 11,193 in 2000. It is located at an elevation of 1,040 meters. The municipal area is 3,069.52 km^{2} (1,185.15 sq mi) with a population of 14,363 registered in 2000.

The land is mountainous and is part of the spurs of the Sierra Madre Occidental mountains. There is a reservoir La Angostura, which dams up the Río Bavispe.

== Communications ==
The municipal seat and main settlement is on Federal Highway 17, which connects Agua Prieta with Hermosillo. The distance to Agua Prieta is 123 kilometers. It is also on the railroad that connects with Agua Prieta. There is a small airport for light aircraft.

== History ==
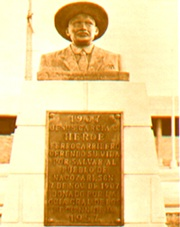
Bust of Jesús García in Nacozari

Nacozari, as it is known today, began with the discovery of mines in 1660. The first settlement was called Nuestra Señora del Rosario de Nacozari and was founded as part of the network of Royal Mines by Jesuit Missionary Gilles de Fiodermon.

The mines were acquired by Anglo American U.B. Freaner mining company in 1867, which sold them to The Moctezuma Copper Company, a subsidiary of Phelps Dodge.

One of the major copper mines at Nacozari Viejo was developed by Charley Streeter in the 1880s. Charley's brother, Zebina Streeter, was shot and killed in the town in 1889.

American style housing was built, together with a library and a small hospital. Copper was hauled partially by mule trains, until the railroad was finished in 1904. By 1907, Nacozari had become the metropolis of far northeastern Sonora. It had a population of about 5,000 people, mostly Mexicans and Americans, with some Chinese. Phelps retained the mines until 1948 when they were exhausted.

A large mine, La Caridad, was discovered about 20 miles southeast of Nacozari in 1968. By 1979, the population of Nacozari was back to about 3,000. As Mexicana de Cobre, the federal government spent hundreds of millions of dollars to develop La Caridad, and revive other mines in the area. Nacozari was estimated to have 18,600 people in 1986, and 30,000 in 1989. La Caridad is ranked the third largest copper mine in the world.

The municipal seat was first called Placeritos de Nacozari but changed its name to Nacozari de García to honor the railroad engineer Jesús García. Garcia saved the town on 7 November 1907 by driving a burning train loaded with dynamite outside of town; he perished in the subsequent explosion. Besides Nacozari, there are monuments to Jesús García in many other Mexican cities and towns. November 7 is the Day of the Railroader in Mexico. All except essential employees of the National Railways of Mexico get the day off. Many streets in Mexico are named Jesús García or the Héroe de Nacozari. Poems and songs have been written about him, and the accident.

The name Nacozari is an Opata word that means "abundance of nopal".

== Economic activity ==
The main economic activity is the copper mine of Mina Mexicana de Cobre, S.A de C.V, which employs most of the labor force (3,012 workers in 2000).

Cattle raising is also important with 16,375 head counted in the 2000 census. Calves are exported to the United States of America.

== Neighboring municipalities ==
Neighboring municipalities are:

- Agua Prieta to the north,
- Bavispe to the east,
- Bacerac to the southeast,
- Villa Hidalgo and Cumpas to the south,
- Arizpe to the west, and
- Bacoachi and Fronteras to the northwest.

== See also ==
- XHNZI-FM
