= Cuajone mine =

Mine in Peru

Coordinates: 17.0430°S 70.7110°W

- Interactive map of Cuajone mine

Location
- Location: Moquegua Region, Peru

Production
- Products: Copper

Cuajone mine is a large copper mine located in the south of Peru in Moquegua Region. Cuajone represents one of the largest copper reserves in Peru and in the world having estimated reserves of 1.6 billion tonnes of ore grading 0.57% copper.

The Cuajone Mine was officially opened in November 1976. It was owned by Southern Peru Copper Corporation, which was a 51% subsidiary of Asarco.

== Geology ==
The porphyry copper deposit and hypogene mineralization occurred in the Early Eocene. Supergene sulfide enrichment began in the Late Oligocene and continued until the Early Miocene. Chalcocite is the more common copper ore mineral as massive assemblages.

== Environmental conflict ==
The Cuajone mine has faced significant environmental conflict, primarily due to claims by local communities that the mine pollutes the environment while not providing sufficient economic benefits. These long-standing grievances have led to direct action, including blockades of rail lines used to transport the mine's products and the disruption of the mine's water supply.

Specifically, in February 2022, community members blockaded the railway and cut off the water supply, demanding $5 billion in compensation and 5% of the mine's profits. The disruption of the water supply was described by Southern Copper as "an attack on the life and health" of approximately 5,000 people in the Cuajone area. The mine's complex begins with a water supply at Lake Suche and ends with a smelter on the South Pacific coast.

=== Consequences and resulting actions ===
The protests have resulted in significant disruptions to the mine's operations. Production at the Cuajone mine was suspended for over 50 days. In March 2022, it was reported that production had been halted for two weeks due to the railway blockage and water supply cut-off. This suspension had significant economic consequences as the mine contributes 7% of Peru's national copper production. The Peruvian government sent the army to restore operations, dismissing the financial demands of the local communities as "irrational". Southern Copper also stated that if the mine were to close for a year, the government would lose more than 3.1 billion sales in taxes and royalties, and 8,000 jobs would be lost. Despite a deal aimed at ending the protests, the mine remained halted, as the company accused the government of failing to guarantee the safety of its workers. Other mines in Peru have faced similar protests, indicating wider social and environmental concerns.

== See also ==
- Toquepala mine
- Quellaveco mine
- Yanacocha
- Cerro de Pasco
- List of mines in Peru
