= Toquepala mine =

Mine in Peru

Coordinates: 17°14′42″S 70°36′50″W

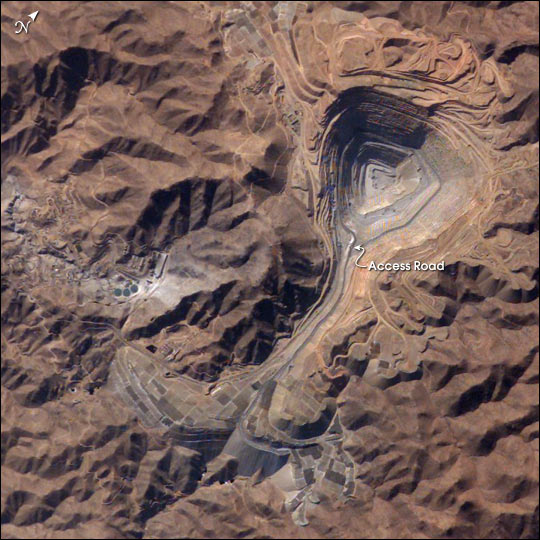
The Toquepala mine from the International Space Station on September 22, 2003. At the surface the open pit is 2.5 kilometers across, and more than 700 meters deep.

The Toquepala mine is a large porphyry copper mine in the Tacna Province, Tacna Department, Peru. The mine is an open-pit mine producing copper, molybdenum, rhenium and silver with minor gold and zinc.

The Toquepala mine and the Ilo smelter were opened in 1960 by Southern Peru Copper Corporation, then a subsidiary of ASARCO. A Solvent extraction/electrowinning (SX/EW) facility was added in 1995. ASARCO's stake in Southern Peru Copper, now 54.2%, passed to Grupo Mexico, when that company purchased ASARCO in 1999. The mine and smelter are now operated by Southern Copper Corporation, a subsidiary of Grupo Mexico.

In 2009, Toquepala produced about 127,000 tons of copper in sulfide concentrates, all smelted at Ilo, with a copper recovery of 97.4%. Toquepala also produced 38,000 tons of copper cathodes from the SX/EW plant.

As of the end of 2009, Toquepala reported about 13 million tons of contained copper metal in proven and probable ore reserves, at an average grade of 0.47% Cu. This corresponds to 2.6 billion tons of ore at 0.47 % Cu + 0.04% Mo + 2.3 gpt Ag. The projected stripping ratio for this ore is about 2.6:1.

In October 2000, Ollanta Humala led an uprising with 50 mutineers who occupied Toquepala town for nine hours, taking four hostages. It was in protest at the corruption of Alberto Fujimori and his advisor Vladimiro Montesinos in their last days in power. Humala was left with just seven soldiers following a series of desertions. All hostages were freed, without bloodshed.

== Geology ==
The porphyry copper deposit and hypogene mineralization occurred in the Early Eocene. Supergene sulfide enrichment began in the Late Oligocene and continued until the Early Miocene. Chalcocite is the more common copper ore mineral as massive assemblages.

== Expansion ==
Toquepala is expanding its concentrator capacity in order to increase annual production by 100,000 tonnes of copper and 3,100 tonnes of molybdenum at a total capital cost of approximately $US1.2 billion. Environmental Impact Assessment (EIA) studies for plant concentration and tailings deposit expansion were recently approved by Peruvian Ministry of Energy and Mining according to directorial resolution Nº611-2014-MEM/DGAAM given on 17 December 2014.

In 2015 Geoservice Ingeniería and Walsh received mandates from Southern Copper Corporation, while the former is executing studies on surface, underground water resources and hydraulic infrastructure, the latest was in charge of executing the Environmental Impact Assessment studies for plant concentration and tailings deposit expansions.

== See also ==
- Cerro de Pasco
- Yanacocha
- Cuajone mine
- Quellaveco mine
- Huancavelica
- Toquepala Caves
- Mining in Peru
- List of mines in Peru
- Zinc mining
