= List of copper mines =

This list of copper mines includes operating, closed and planned mines that have substantial copper output.

== Africa/Middle East ==
=== Democratic Republic of the Congo ===
- Deziwa Mine
- Dikulushi mine
- Dikuluwe Mine
- Etoile mine
- Frontier mine
- Kabolela mine
- Kakanda deposit
- Kalakundi MIne
- Kalumbwe Myunga Mine
- Kalumines
- Kamatanda
- Kamfundwa mine
- Kamoa-Kakuila mine
- Kamoto Mine
- Kamoya Central
- Kamoya South
- Kananga mine
- Kapulo mine
- Kinsenda mine
- Kinsevere mine
- Kipoi mine
- Kipushi mine
- Kisanfu mine
- Kolwezi Copper mine
- Kolwezi Tailings project
- KOV mine
- Lonshi mine
- Luishia mine
- Luiswishi mine
- Lupoto mine
- M'sesa mine
- Mabende mine
- Mashamba East mine
- Mukondo mine
- Musonoi mine
- Musoshi mine
- Mutanda mine
- Mutoshi mine
- Ruashi mine
- Shabara mine
- Shangolowe
- Shituru
- Tenke Fungurume mine
- Tilwezembe mine

=== Eritrea ===
- Bisha mine

=== Iran ===
- Anjerd
- Bavanat
- Chah Firoozeh
- Chehel Kureh
- Darreh Alu
- Darreh Zar
- Darreh Zereshk
- Ghaleh Zari
- Janja
- Khazek
- Lak
- Mazrae
- Miduk
- Sarcheshmeh
- Sargaz
- Sungun copper mine
- Tarom-e Sofla
- Taknar
- Zavak

=== Mauritania ===
- Guelb Moghreine

=== Saudi Arabia ===
- Jabal Sayid mine

=== South Africa ===
- Jaydeep
- Palabora mine

=== Zambia ===
- Chambishi Mines
- Chibuluma Mine
- Kansanshi Mine
- Konkola
- Luanshya mine
- Lubambe mine
- Lumwana mine
- Mufulira Mine
- Nchanga Mines
- Nkana Mine
- Rokana
- Sentinel mine

== Asia/Pacific Rim ==
=== Afghanistan ===
- Mes Aynak
- Shaida Copper Mine

=== Australia ===
- Mount Isa Mines
- Northparkes mine
- Olympic Dam mine

=== Bougainville Island ===
- Bougainville Copper (inactive)

=== Indonesia ===
- Batu Hijau mine
- Grasberg mine

=== Mongolia ===
- Erdenet Mining Corporation
- Oyu Tolgoi mine

=== Myanmar/Burma ===
- Myanmar Wanbao Copper Mining Limited
- Myanmar Yang Tse Copper Limited

=== Philippines ===
- Carmen Copper Mine (Toledo City, Cebu)

== Europe ==
=== Cyprus ===
- Kalavasos
- Kampia
- Limni
- Skouriotissa: (the oldest operating mine in the world)
- Tamassos

=== Finland ===
- Kevitsa mine

=== Poland ===
- OZG Polkowice-Sieroszowice
- OZG Rudna
- Zakłady Górnicze Lubin

=== Romania ===
- Roșia Poieni copper mine

=== Serbia ===
- RTB Bor

=== Sweden ===
- Aitik
- Bolidenområdet
- Garpenberg

=== United Kingdom ===
- Alderley Edge Mines

== North America ==
=== Canada ===
- Coldstream copper mine
- Coleman Mine
- Copper Mountain mine
- Duck Pond mine
- Galore Creek mine
- Gibraltar Mine
- Highland Valley Copper mine
- Huckleberry mine
- Kidd Creek mine
- Mount Polley mine
- New Afton mine
- Red Chris Mine
- Schaft Creek

=== Mexico ===
- Buenavista mine
- El Arco mine
- El Pilar mine
- La Caridad Mine

=== United States ===
- Adventure mine
- Bagdad mine
- Bingham Canyon Mine
- Cliff mine
- El Chino Mine
- Kennecott
- Mohawk Mine
- Morenci Mine
- Pebble Mine
- Quincy Mine
- Rosemont Ranch mine
- Safford Mine
- Tyrone mine

== South America ==
=== Argentina ===
- Alumbrera mine

=== Brazil ===
- Serrote mine
- Sossego mine

=== Chile ===
- Alcaparrosa mine
- Andina mine
- Antucoya mine
- Candelaria mine
- Carmen de Andacollo mine
- Caserones mine
- Centinela mine
- Cerro Colorado mine
- Chañarcillo
- Chuquicamata mine
- Collahuasi mine
- Dominga mine
- Dulcinea mine
- El Abra mine
- El Inglés mine
- El Morado mine
  - Arenillas mine
  - Santo Domingo mine
- El Salvador mine
- El Soldado mine
- El Teniente mine
- Escondida mine
- Esperanza mine
- Franke mine
- Gabriela Mistral mine
- Golondrina mine
- Inca de Oro mine
- Lomas Bayas mine
- Los Bronces mine
- Los Pelambres mine
- Mantos Blancos mine
- Mantoverde mine
- Michilla mine
- Ministro Hales mine
- Panulcillo
  - Asunción mine
  - Delta mine
  - Panulcillo Alto mine
  - San Gregorio mine
- Quebrada Blanca mine
- Radomiro Tomic mine
- Sierra Gorda mine
- Spence mine
- Tres Valles mine
- Zaldívar mine

=== Peru ===
- Antamina mine
- Austria Duvaz Morococha copper mine
- Cerro Corona mine
- Cerro Verde Copper-Molybdenum Mine
- Cobriza mine
- Constancia mine
- La Granja mine
- Las Bambas copper mine
- Quellaveco mine
- Tia Maria mine
- Tintaya mine
- Toquepala mine
- Toromocho mine

== See also ==
- List of countries by copper production
- List of copper production by company
