= List of mines in Chile =

This is a list of mines in Chile currently active and organized by product. The top five most productive mines of each product are shown in bold.

== Copper ==
- Alcaparrosa
- Andina
- Antucoya
- Candelaria
- Carmen de Andacollo
- Caserones
- Cerro Colorado
- Centinela
- **Collahuasi**
- **Chuquicamata**
- Dulcinea
- El Abra
- El Inglés
- El Morado
  - Arenillas
  - Santo Domingo
- El Salvador
- El Soldado
- **El Teniente**
- **Escondida**
- Esperanza
- Franke
- Gabriela Mistral
- Golondrina
- Inca de Oro
- Lomas Bayas
- Los Bronces
- **Los Pelambres**
- Mantos Blancos
- Mantoverde
- Michilla
- Ministro Hales
- Panulcillo
  - Asunción
  - Delta
  - Panulcillo Alto
  - San Gregorio
- Quebrada Blanca
- Radomiro Tomic
- Sierra Gorda
- Spence
- Zaldívar

== Gold ==
- Candelaria (primarily copper)
- Cerro Casale
- **Centinela** (primarily copper)
- **Collahuasi** (primarily copper)
- El Morro
- **El Peñón**
- El Toqui (primarily zinc)
- **Escondida** (primarily copper)
- **La Coipa**
- Maricunga
- Salares Norte
- Tambo de Oro

== Iron ==
- Bellavista
- Candelaria (primarily copper)
- **El Carmen**
- **Cerro Negro Norte**
- **Los Colorados**
- El Pleito
- **El Romeral**
- El Dorado

== Lead ==
- **El Toqui**

== Silver ==
- Candelaria
- Salares Norte

== Titanium ==
- **Cerro Blanco**

== Zinc ==
- **El Toqui**
