= Consejo Minero =

Chilean mining industry association

Consejo Minero (lit. Mining Council) is a guild grouping large mining companies active in Chile. According to Consejo Minero in 2025 its companies produce 94% of Chile's copper, 96% of its iron, 90% of its silver and 63% of its gold and lithium. Its members are Anglo American, BHP, CMP, Minera Centinela, Codelco, Compañía Minera Doña Inés de Collahuasi, El Abra (owned by Freeport-McMoRan and Codelco), Minera Escondida, Freeport-McMoRan, Glencore, Gold Fields, KGHM, Kinross, Lundin Mining, Pampa Norte, Minera Los Pelambres, Rio Tinto, South32, Sociedad Química y Minera and Teck Resources. Prior to the joining of Compañía de Acero del Pacífico (CAP) in 2017 the guild lacked any company engaged in the production of iron.

The organization was established in 1997.

Its former presidents include Francisco Costabal (2005–2010), Miguel Ángel Durán (2010–2011), Jean-Paul Luksić (2011–2017), Jorge Gómez (2017–2022) and Iván Arriagada (2022–).

== See also ==
- Canadian mining in Latin America and the Caribbean
- Chilean nationalization of copper
- Chilean Law on Mining Concessions
- Sociedad Nacional de Minería
