= Francisco Costabal =

Chilean mining business administrator

- Education: Pontifical Catholic University of Chile
- Occupation: Business administrator in mining
- Years active: 1972–present
- Employer(s): Compañía de Acero del Pacífico; Codelco; BHP (until 2010); Freeport-McMoRan (2010–2023)
- Organization(s): Mining Council, National Mining Society
- Spouse: María Gloria González Ariztía (died 2022)

Francisco Costabal Madrid is a Chilean business executive known for his role in leading various mining companies and organizations. He has worked for various mining companies such as BHP, Compañía de Acero del Pacífico, Codelco and Freeport-McMoRan. He has also been president of the mining trade organization Mining Council (2005–2010) and vice-president of the National Mining Society. In 2010 he left the presidency of the board BHP's Minera Spence and joined Freeport-McMoRan. In Freeport-McMoRan Costabal was in charge of the company's South American operations including El Abra, Ojos del Salado and Candelaria in Chile and Cerro Verde in Peru.

On August 23, 2010, Costabal was homaged by Asociación de la Asociación de Grandes Proveedores Industriales de la Minería (APRIMIN) and in 2023 by the National Mining Society. In Freeport-McMoRan Francisco Costabal was vicepresident until May 2023.
