= Iron oxide copper gold ore deposits =

Type of ore

Iron oxide copper gold ore deposits (IOCG) are important and highly valuable concentrations of copper, gold and uranium ores hosted within iron oxide dominant gangue assemblages which share a common genetic origin.

These ore bodies range from around 10 million to >4,000 million tonnes of contained ore, and have a grade of between 0.2% and 5% copper, with gold contents ranging from 0.1 to 1.41 grams per tonne. These ore bodies tend to express as cone-like, blanket-like breccia sheets within granitic margins, or as long ribbon-like breccia or massive iron oxide deposits within faults or shears.

The tremendous size, relatively simple metallurgy and relatively high grade of IOCG deposits can produce extremely profitable mines, although the formation of these deposits is still not fully understood, and the fluid origin of the world class deposits are still being investigated.

Iron oxide copper-gold deposits are also often associated with other valuable trace elements such as uranium, bismuth and rare-earth metals, although these accessories are typically subordinate to copper and gold in economic terms.

Some examples include the Olympic Dam, South Australia, and Candelaria, Chile deposits.

== Classification ==
Iron oxide copper gold (IOCG) deposits comprise a geologically and genetically diverse group for which the definition, classification and ore-forming processes remain debated.

Iron oxide copper gold deposits are considered to be metasomatic expressions of large crustal-scale alteration events driven by intrusive activity. The deposit type was first recognised by discovery and study of the supergiant Olympic Dam copper-gold-uranium deposit (Olympic Dam mine), and South American examples.

IOCG deposits are classified as separate to other large intrusive related copper deposits such as porphyry copper deposits and other porphyry metal deposits primarily by their substantial accumulations of iron oxide minerals, association with felsic-intermediate type intrusives (Na-Ca rich granitoids), and lack of the complex zonation in alteration mineral assemblies commonly associated with porphyry deposits.

The relatively simple copper-gold +/- uranium ore assemblage is also distinct from the wide spectrum of Cu-Au-Ag-Mo-W-Bi porphyry deposits, and there is often no metal zonation within recognised examples of IOCG deposits. IOCG deposits tend to also accumulate within faults as epigenetic mineralisation distal to the source intrusion, whereas porphyries are much more proximal to intrusive bodies.

== Deposit features ==
A feature of IOCG ore deposits is the large variability between deposits regarding the ore grades, alteration styles, and fluid inclusion characteristics that leads to the lack of a complete model for the deposits formation.

An important feature of these deposits is the depth of formation, which ranges from the deep upper crust at depths of over 10km, to paleosurfaces. This main feature sets apart IOCG type deposits from porphyry skarn Cu-Au deposits which are from shallow depths of formation (<5km depth). The formation at deeper depths has implications such as ore fluids from a deep source.

=== Similar deposit styles ===
IOCG deposits are still relatively loosely defined and as such, some large and small deposits of various types may or may not fit within this deposit classification. IOCG deposits may have skarn-like affinities (e.g.; Wilcherry Hill, Cairn Hill), although they are not strictly skarns in that they are not metasomatites in the strictest sense.

IOCG deposits can express a wide variety of deposit morphologies and alteration types dependent on their host stratigraphy, the tectonic processes operating at the time (e.g., some provinces show a preference for development within shears and structural zones), and so on.

IOCG deposits have been recognised within epithermal regimes (caldera and maar styles) through to brittle-ductile regimes deeper within the crust (e.g. Prominent Hill, some Mount Isa examples, Brazilian examples). What is common in IOCGs is their genesis within magmatic-driven crustal-scale hydrothermal systems.

== Genesis ==
Iron oxide copper gold deposits typically form within 'provinces' where several deposits of similar style, timing and similar genesis form within similar geologic settings. The genesis and provenance of IOCG deposits, their alteration assemblages and gangue mineralogy may vary between provinces, but all are related to;

- Major regional thermal event broadly coeval with IOCG formation, represented by low to medium grade metamorphism, and/or mafic intrusions, and/or I- or A-type granitoids
- Host stratigraphy is relatively Fe-enriched (BIF, ironstones), but have relatively little reduced carbon (e.g.; coal, etc.).
- Regional-scale alteration systems, operating over tens or hundreds of kilometres, involving admixture of at least two fluids
- Large-scale crustal structures which allow extensive hydrothermal circulation of mineralising fluids

IOCG deposits typically occur at the margins of large igneous bodies which intrude into sedimentary strata. As such, IOCG deposits form pipe-like, mantle-like or extensive breccia-vein sheets within the host stratigraphy. Morphology is often not an important criterion of the ore body itself, and is determined by the host stratigraphy and structures.

IOCG deposits are usually associated with distal zones of particular large-scale igneous events, for instance a particular Suite or Supersuite of granites, intermediate mafic intrusives of a particular age. Often the mineralising intrusive event becomes a diagnostic association for expressions of IOCG mineralisation within a given province.

IOCG mineralisation may accumulate within metasomatised wall rocks, within brecciated maar or caldera structures, faults or shears, or the aureole of an intrusive event (possibly as a skarn) and is typically accompanied by a substantial enrichment in iron oxide minerals (hematite, magnetite). IOCG deposits tend to accumulate within iron-rich rocks such as banded iron formations, iron schists, etcetera, although iron enrichment of siliciclastic rocks by metasomatism is also recognised within some areas.

Although not exclusively Proterozoic, within Australia and South America a majority of IOCG deposits are recognised to be within Neoproterozoic to Mesoproterozoic basement. Worldwide, ages of recognised IOCG deposits range from 1.8 Ga to 15 Ma, however, the majority are within the 1.6 Ga to 850 Ma range.

== Ore fluids formation ==
One of the biggest factors in the formation of IOCG deposits is the presence of ore fluids. The driving factor for the fluids movement in the upper crust is the present paleogeothermal gradients, as well as regional hydrothermal systems responsible for the alteration within these deposits. IOCG deposits have a distinctive set of two fluids vital in their formation:

- Highly oxidized fluids such as a meteoric or ground waters
- Brines of magmatic hydrothermal fluid or fluids that have reacted with metamorphic rocks, that are deep sourced and high temperature

There is also evidence of other fluids that are volatile rich in the formation of these deposits.

== Factors of ore formation ==
There is controversy in regards to the factors that control the formation of the ore in these deposits, as they display a lot of variety between deposits in regards to the ore grades, alteration styles, fluid inclusion characteristics, and their links to their tectonic settings, and nearby intrusions. This has led to the lack of a complete model for the deposits' formation.

A variety of models have been made to try and model the formation of these deposits, such as IOCG deposits as the lower root portion of iron oxide-apatite formation, or models of complex interactions between more than two fluids of magmatic, surficial, sedimentary, or metamorphic origin. There is still controversy to these origins, but using tracing of fluid sources has opened exploration possibilities in recent years to large deposits in Australia, such as the Olympic Dam deposit, where using fluorites rare-earth element (REE) chemistry, the fluids in the formation of the deposits were identified.

== Mineralogy and alteration ==
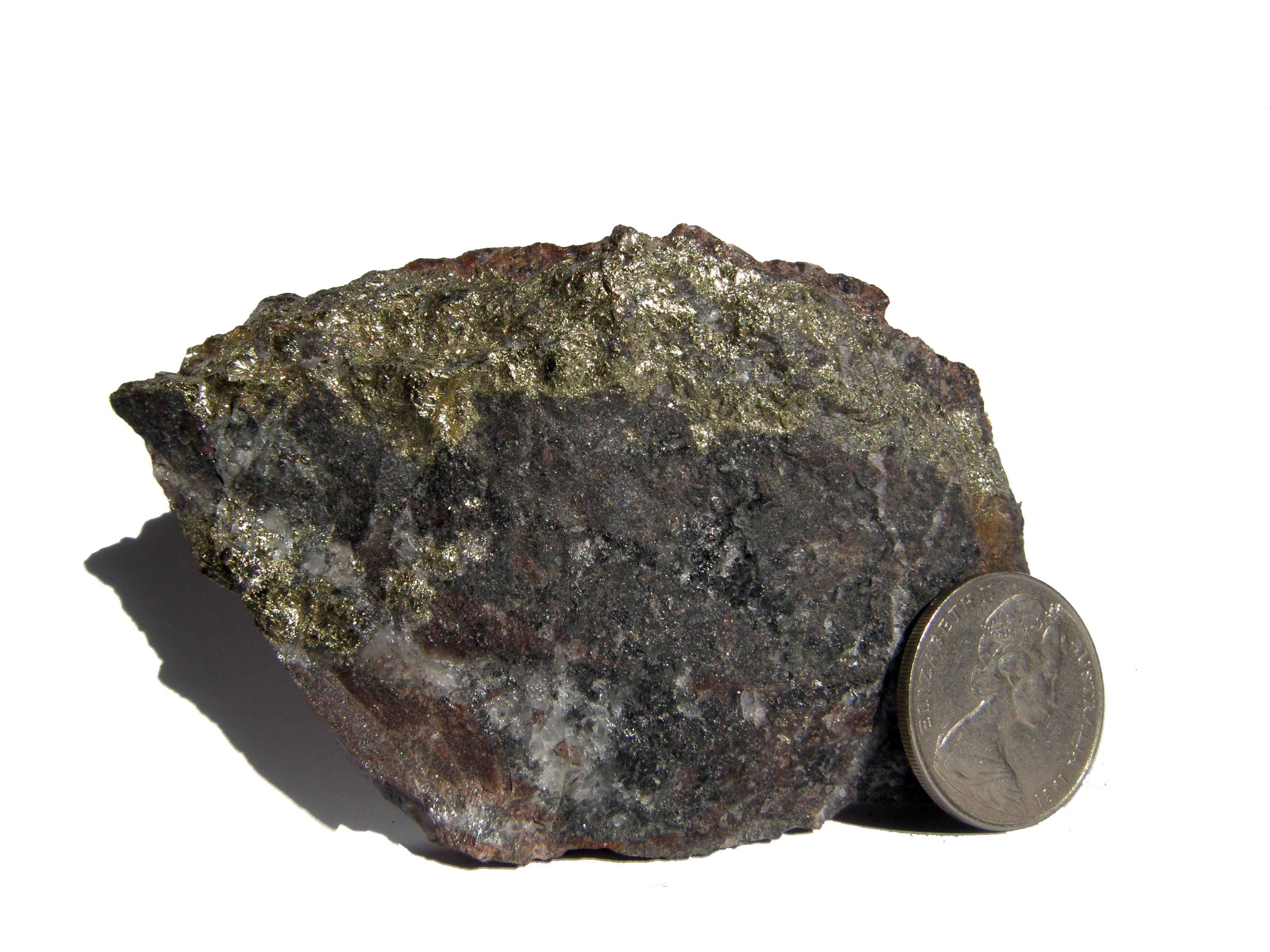
Chalcopyrite-rich ore specimen from Olympic Dam

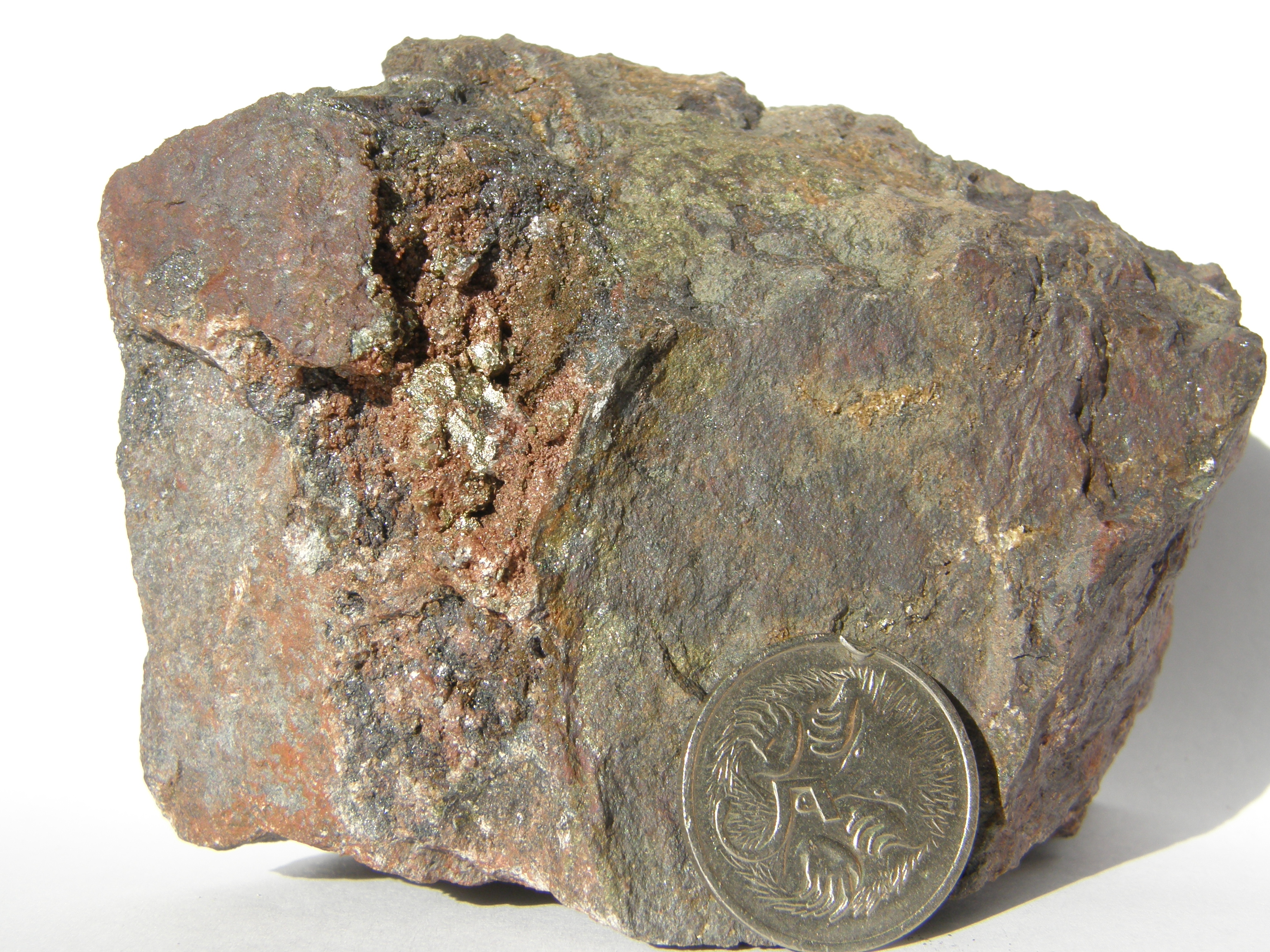
Chalcopyrite in hematised breccia from Prominent Hill

Ore minerals in IOCG deposits are typically copper-iron sulfide chalcopyrite and gangue pyrite, forming 10–15% of the rock mass.

Supergene profiles can be developed above weathered examples of IOCG deposits, as exemplified by the Sossego deposit, Para State, Brazil, where typical oxidised copper minerals are present, e.g.; malachite, cuprite, native copper and minor amounts of digenite and chalcocite.

Alteration is a mixture of sodic-calcic (albite-epidote) to potassic (K-feldspar) in style, and may vary from province to province based on host rocks and mineralising processes. Typically for large-scale hydrothermal systems, fluid types within IOCG systems show a mixed provenance of magmatic, metamorphic and often meteoric waters. Deposits may be vertically zoned from deeper albite-magnetite assemblages trending toward silica-K-feldspar-sericite in the upper portions of the deposits.

Gangue minerals are typically some form of iron oxide mineral, classically hematite, but also magnetite within some other examples such as Ernest Henry and some Argentinian examples. This is typically associated with gangue sulfides of pyrite, with subordinate pyrrhotite and other base metal sulfides.

Silicate gangue minerals include actinolite, pyroxene, tourmaline, epidote and chlorite, with apatite, allanite and other phosphate minerals common in some IOCG provinces (e.g.; North American examples), with carbonate-barite assemblages also reported. Where present, rare-earth metals tend to associate with phosphate minerals.

When iron oxide species trend towards magnetite or crystalline massive hematite, IOCG deposits may be economic based on their iron oxide contents alone. Several examples of IOCG deposits (Wilcherry Hill, Cairn Hill, Kiruna) are iron ore deposits.

== Economic mineral occurrence ==
IOCG ore deposits containing economic quantities (highly profitable) of both copper and gold originate from the Precambrian. Larger deposits with >100 tons of resources occur near Paleoprotozoic and Archean cratons. These large deposits formed by mantle underplating impacts to metasomatized lithospheric mantle, and smaller deposits form by tectonic settings replication of this process in more recent times.

The content of gold within these deposits is largely variable, and can be a factor in the economic value of the deposit. The gold contents of all deposits averages 0.41 g/t Au, with the majority of worldwide deposits averaging less than 1 g/t Au.

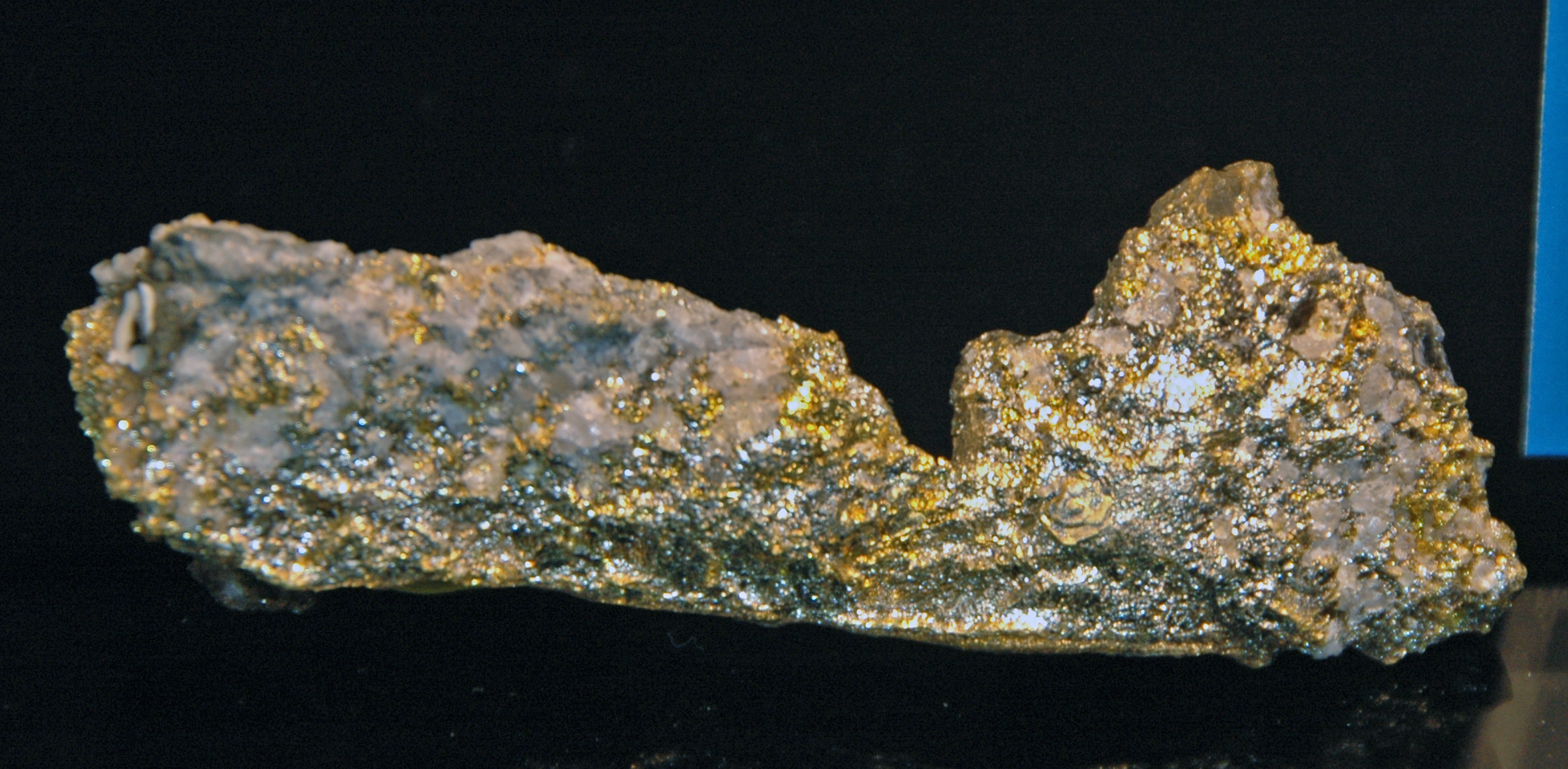
The occurrence of native gold mineralization. Example from Kalgoorlie Australia.

The contents of gold can appear in three different forms in these deposits:

- Native gold
- Electrum
- Gold–bismuth–antimony–tellurium alloy

World-class IOCG deposits contain consistent Cu grades, between 0.7–1.5% Cu, higher copper grades than that of most world class gold-rich porphyry copper deposits.

== Exploration ==
Within the Olympic Domain of the Gawler Craton, exploration for Olympic Dam style IOCG deposits has relied on four main criteria for targeting exploratory drill holes;

- A substantial gravity anomaly, taken to be representative of accumulation of iron oxide minerals within the crust, which is seen as being associated with classic Olympic Dam style IOCG mineralisation. Gravity data is often interpreted via a 3D inversion to resolve the density contrast and sub-surface position of a dense body of rock. More qualitatively, the "edges" of a gravity body are considered more prospective as this theoretically represents the mineralised margins of an intrusive body.
- High magnetism within the crust, again taken to be representative of accumulation of substantial iron oxide minerals within proximity to the targeted IOCG mineralising events
- Proximity to apparent crustal-scale linear features in geophysical data, which are taken to represent the fundamental crustal architectural faults up which mineralising intrusions and fluids would by preference travel
- Presence of the prospective Hiltaba Granite Suite, which is dated to 1570 Ma coeval with Olympic Dam and the other known IOCG examples within the province

This exploration model is applicable to the most basic of exploration criteria for identifying prospective areas likely to form IOCG deposits. In better exposed terranes, prospecting for alteration assemblages and skarns, in concert with geochemical exploration is also likely to yield success.

== Examples ==
=== Australia ===
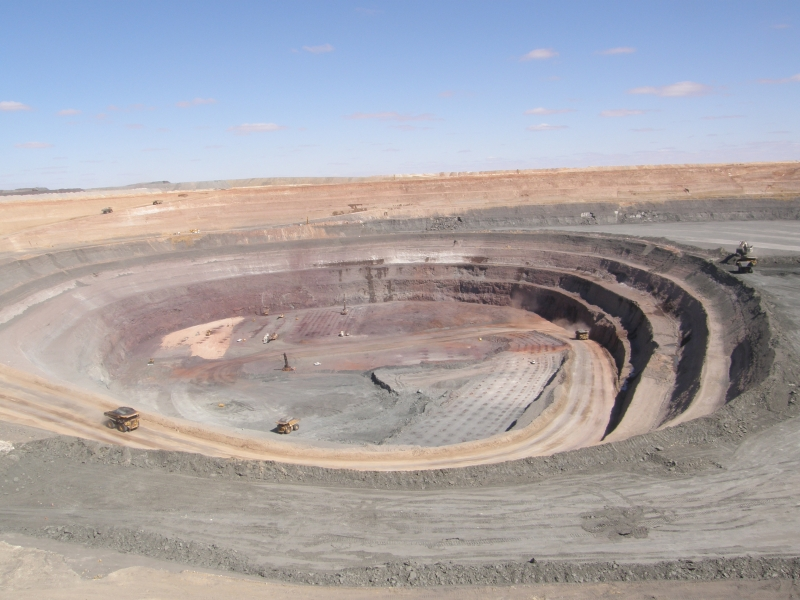
Pit of Prominent Hill IOCG deposit in 2008

Gawler Craton IOCG province, South Australia

- Olympic Dam: 8,330 million tonnes of ore at 0.8% Cu, 280 ppm U_{3}O_{8}, 0.76g/t Au and 3.95 g/t Ag + 151 Mt at 1.0 g/t Au
- Carrapateena mine: 203Mt @ 1.31% Cu, 0.56g/t Au, only partially explored. Best drilling results include 905 m at 2.1% Cu and 1.0 g/t
- Hillside: 170Mt @ 0.7% Cu and 0.2 g/t Au (upgraded resource estimate Dec. 2010)
- Prominent Hill Mine: 152.8 Mt at 1.18% Cu, 0.48 g/t Au, 2.92 g/t Ag + 38.3 Mt at 1.17 g/t Au
- Wilcherry Hill: +60Mt @ 31% Fe, associated Cu and Au
- Cairn Hill: Resources 14Mt @ 50% Fe, 0.2% Cu, 0.1 g/t Au. Reserves of 6.9Mt @ 51.% Fe, 0.2% Cu and 0.1 g/t Au

Cloncurry district, Queensland, Australia:

- Mt. Elliott: 475 Mt at 0.5% Cu, 0.3 g/t Au
- Ernest Henry: 122 Mt at 1.18% Cu, 0.55 g/t Au
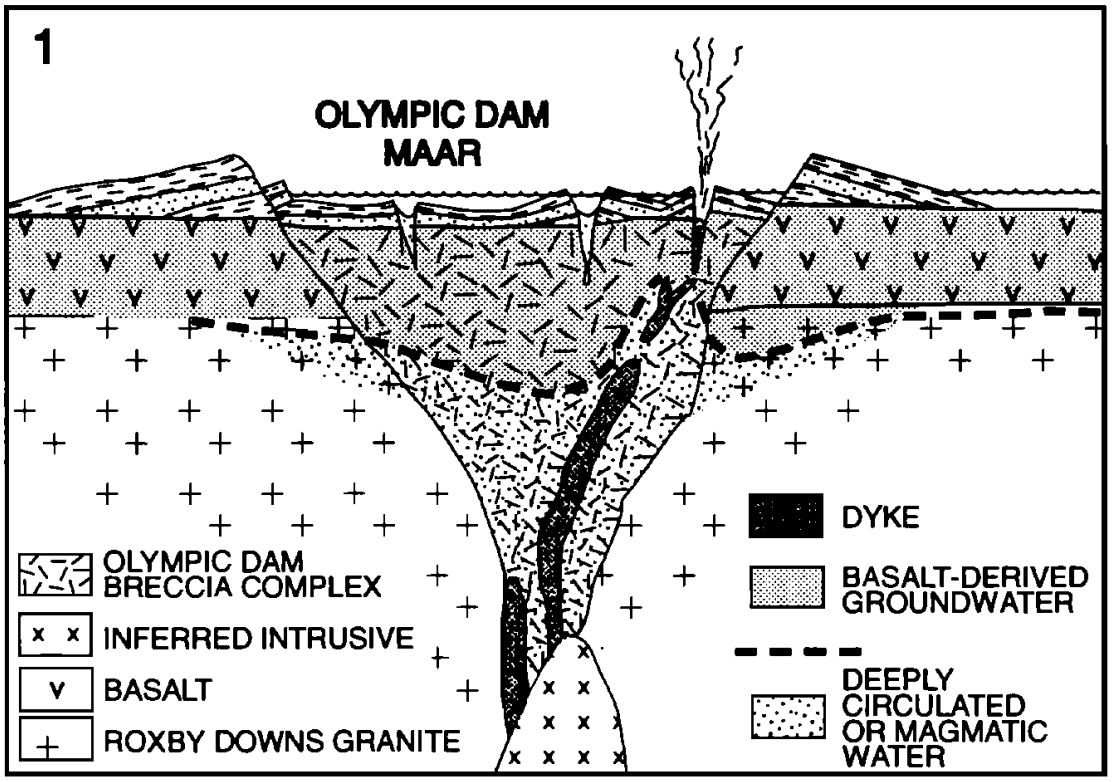
  The Geology of Olympic Dam iron oxide copper gold deposit, Australia

=== South America ===
Punta del Cobre IOCG province, Chile

- Candelaria Cu-Au-Ag Deposit: Resources of 600 Mt @ 0.95% Cu, 0.2 g/t Au, 3 g/t Ag. Reserve comprises 470 Mt @ 0.95% Cu, 0.22 g/t Au, 3.1 g/t Ag
- Mantos Blancos Deposit: Resources of >500 Mt @ 1.0% Cu.
- Mantoverde Cu-Au Deposit: Cu oxide resources 180 Mt @ 0.5% Cu overlying a sulfide resource of >400 Mt @ 0.52% Cu.

Para State IOCG province, Brazil

- Salobo Cu-Au: Reserves of 986 Mt @ 0.82% Cu, 0.49 g/t Au at a 0.5% Cu cutoff (2004).
- Cristalino Cu-Au Deposit: 500 Mt @ 1.0% Cu, 0.2–0.3 g/t Au. Reserves amount to 261 Mt @ 0.73% Cu
- Sossego Cu-Au Deposit: 355 Mt @ 1.1% Cu, 0.28 g/t Au. Reserves of 245 Mt @ 1.1% Cu, 0.28 g/t Au
- Alemão Cu-Au-(REE)-(U): Resources of 170 Mt @ 1.5% Cu, 0.8 g/t Au (depleted).
- Igarapé Bahia Cu-Au-(REE)-(U): >30 Mt @ 2 g/t Au.

Marcona IOCG district in Southern Peru

- Marcona Mine 1,400 million tonnes iron ore
- Pampa de Pongo 1,000 million tonnes 75% magnetite
- Mina Justa copper-gold deposit

Some authors (e.g., Skirrow et al. 2004) consider the iron ore deposits of Kiruna, Sweden as being IOCG deposits. Similar styles of fault-hosted magnetite-hematite breccias with minor copper-gold mineralisation and skarns are recognised within the Gawler Craton, South Australia, which would be recognised as IOCG deposits.

== See also ==
- Ore genesis
- Porphyry copper
- Metasomatism

== External links and further reading ==
- "Footprints of Fe-oxide(-Cu-Au) systems"
- Porter, T. M. editor, Hydrothermal iron oxide copper-gold and related deposits: a global perspective, PGC Publishing a division of Porter GeoConsultancy (2002), 349 pages, ISBN 0-9580574-0-0
- Porter, T. M. editor, Hydrothermal iron oxide copper-gold and related deposits: a global perspective, Volume 2, PGC Publishing a division of Porter GeoConsultancy (2002) 377 pages, ISBN 0-9580574-1-9
