= Arriagada =

Arriagada is a Basque surname. Notable people include:

- Carmen Arriagada (1807–1888), Chilean writer
- Cristián Arriagada (born 1981), Chilean actor
- Iván Arriagada (born 1963), Chilean businessman
- Jorge Arriagada (born 1943), Chilean film composer
- Marcelo Arriagada (born 1973), Chilean cyclist
- Marco Arriagada (born 1975), Chilean cyclist
