= Santo Domingo mine =

Copper mine in Chile

Santo Domingo
- Location within Atacama Region Location within Chile
- Location: Atacama Region, Chile; 26°27′54.82″S 70°0′22.22″W
- Products: Copper, iron, gold, cobalt
- Company: Capstone Copper

Santo Domingo is a polymetallic mine project in Chile's Atacama Region. The mine is planned to produce copper and iron and as by-products also cobalt and gold. The project is run and owned by Capstone Copper which also owns Mantoverde mine 35 km southwest of the Santo Domingo project. The area of Santo Domingo have mineral reserves of 436 million tonnes (Mt) at a copper grade of 0.33%, iron ore grade of 26.5%, and a gold grade of 0.05 grams per tonne. The mine is expected to operate for 19 years, once it opens which could happen in 2028.

The mine project lies in the commune of Diego de Almagro at 1,000 to 1,280 m a.s.l. and 130 km north-northeast of the city of Copiapó.

Geologically, the deposit is of Iron oxide copper gold type that formed in the Cretaceous and is one of many deposits along the Chilean Iron Belt. The rocks hosting the mineralizations are in some parts volcanic in other parts marine and sedimentary. The ore is associated to hydrothermal alteration of sodic (-calcic) and potassic type in addition to carbonate and calc-silicate skarn. The deposit lies in the eastern fringes of the north-south Atacama Fault Zone.

Mineral exploration in the area begun in 2002 and Far West Mining made explorations until 2011 when it was purchased by Capstone and Korean Resources which continued work. In April 2021 Capstone purchased Koren Resources' 30% stake in the project and obtained a 100% ownership in it. In 2022 the Capstone rebranded into Capstone Copper after merging with Mantos Copper.
