= Aclara Resources =

Rare-earth elements mining company

- Company type: Public
- Industry: Rare-earth elements
- Genre: Mining
- Founded: 2021
- Area served: Brazil, Chile, United States
- Key people: Ramón Barúa (CEO)
- Parent: Hochschild Mining (55.9%)

Aclara Resources is a rare-earth elements company with mining projects in Brazil and Chile and mineral processing projects in the United States. It is a publicly owned company whose major stakes are held by Hochschild Mining (55.9%) and CAP (10.1%). (Note: In late March 2026 CAP announced it was seeking to increase its participation in Aclara Resources from 10% to 13%.) It is listed on the Toronto Stock Exchange.

The mines in Brazil and Chile are planned to supply a rare-earth separator plant that is under construction as of March 2026 in Louisiana in the US. In 2025 the company claimed that by 2028 it expected to supply more than 75% of the US demand of dysprosium (Dy) and terbium (Tb).

The company traces its origins to 2018 when Hochschild Mining purchased 6.2% of the Chilean company BioLantánidos (Note: BioLántanidos was a trade name of REE UNO SpA. This company in turn emerged between 2012 and 2014 from a exploratory drilling campaign that was carried out in Penco by Fondo Fénix, a public–private fund financed in part by the Production Development Corporation (CORFO).) which was owned by the Minería Activa-administered FIP Lantanidos fund of LarrainVial. In this initial investment Hochschild Mining obtained an option for further purchases. In 2019 Hochschild Mining gained full ownership of BioLantánidos by buying the remaining 93.8% stakes. Later, in 2021 Hochschild Mining rebraded the company to Aclara Resources and inscribed it in the Toronto Stock Exchange.

== Brazil ==
The location of Aclara Resources mining and mineral processing facilities.

In Brazil Aclara Resources is focused on providing magnetic rare-earth oxides (MREOs) to a magnet production facility in South Carolina, US. The Carina project in Nova Roma, Goiás claimed in November 2025 to be the first HREE (Dy, Tb, Pr, Nr) mining project in the world to declare reserves hosted in ionic clays.

== Chile ==
In Chile BioLantánidos, the predecessor of Aclara Resources, begun in 2016 plans to commercially exploit rare-earth metals nex to Penco. This project, known as Penco Module (Spanish: Módulo Penco), had as of March 2026 its environmental impact assessment under evaluation by the Environmental Assessment Service. If approved the mine is planned to start production in 2028, delivering an average of 811 tons of RRE-oxides annually. In Chile the company has faced accusations of starting the 2026 Chilean wildfires to pave the way for the approval of the Penco Module.

Hochschild Mining claimed in 2019 that no use of explosive will be needed for the extraction of REEs, whose mineralizations reportedly does not go deeper than 20 to 30 m below the ground.

== United States ==
In the United States the company is building a REE plant in the Port of Vinton which is part of "a wave of North American investment in rare earths separation, processing and magnet manufacturing". Aclara Resources has co-developed technology with Virginia Tech.
