= Rare-earth resources in Chile =

Location of some of the principal rare-earth resources being explored in Chile.

Chile is relatively unexplored for rare-earth elements (REEs) and as of 2026 there is no mining of REEs. The Chilean Ministry of Mining has led efforts to characterize REE resources in the country. Chile's main REEs resources have been identified as of 2026 to lie in the commune of Penco near the coast in central Chile, in the Norte Chico between Coquimbo and Copiapó and in Lauca River basin in northernmost Chile.

Old tailings from the mining of other resources have also been identified as potential sources of rare-earth metals in Chile. Reprocessing of the tailings for REE extraction is expected to be water and energy intensive and will also generate new tailings.

Rare-earth mining Chile operates under the general laws that apply to other forms of mining and does not have a specific legal framework. In March 2026 Chile signed an agreement with the United States with regards to the exploitation and commercialization of rare-earth metals. (Note: The agreement was published under the name Joint Declaration for the Establishment of Consultations on Critical Minerals and Rare Earth Elements (Spanish: Declaración Conjunta para el Establecimiento de Consultas sobre Minerales Críticos y Tierras Raras) and was signed on March 12 by Chile's Minister of Foreign Affairs Francisco Pérez Mackenna and Deputy Secretary Christopher Landau.) This move has been interpreted by analysts an attempt by the United States to diminish Chinese influence in the rare-earth metals market. (Note: In December 2024, Trump nominated former United States Border Patrol agent Brandon Judd as the United States ambassador to Chile. In his Senate confirmation meeting, Judd stated that he wanted to "restrict China’s access to Chile's resources.")

== Coastal belt of south-central Chile ==
The main site of REE mining projects in Chile has since the early 2010s been Penco, where Aclara Resources drives project. About 60 km south of Penco regolith formed from granites of the Coastal Batholith of central Chile in Cordillera de Nahuelbuta have been investigated as a source of rare-earth metals. North of Penco NeoRe and Chilean Cobalt Corp have together explored for REE in the coastal communes of Chanco, Cobquecura and Pelluhue.

=== Penco ===
Between 2012 and 2014 an exploratory drilling campaign was carried out in Penco by Fondo Fénix, a public–private fund financed in part by the Production Development Corporation (CORFO). By 2016 more than 1000 m of exploratory drillings had been carried out in the Penco area, with drilling depths averaging about 50 m.

In 2016 the site was visited by the intendant of Biobío Region and officials from China, including from the Raw Materials Industry Department. Since at last 2015 the mining project was led by the company REE UNO SpA, also known by its trade name BioLantánidos, until it rebranded into Aclara Resources (Note: Aclara Resources is owned in 55.9% by Hochschild Mining and 10.1% by CAP.) in 2021. The mining project of Aclara Resources, known as Penco Module (Spanish: Módulo Penco), had as of March 2026 its environmental impact assessment under evaluation by the Environmental Assessment Service. If approved the mine is planned to produce an average of 811 tons of RRE-oxides annually, starting production in 2028. The mine in Penco is part of scheme by Aclara Resources that includes more mines in Brazil and a rare-earth separator plant in Louisiana in the United States to be supplied with the output from its future mines. The mining project in Penco had been previously rejected by the National Forest Corporation for its impact on the tree species Citronella mucronata. The 2026 Chilean wildfires occurred in January over much of the project area wiping out both the native forest hosting the Citronella mucronata and exotic forest plantations. The fact that the wildfire could potentially benefit the mining project and that it allegedly started simultaneously in patches of native forest led to accusations of the fires being intentional on behalf of Aclara Resources.

For its Penco project Aclara has declared a total REE grade (TREO) of 2,292 ppm.

=== Cobquecura ===
In the commune of Cobquecura north of Penco the site "Esperanza 7" had as of April 2026 been selected by Cobalt Corp's (Chilean Cobalt) NeoRe project as the site for a REE mine and processing plant. The site is reported to have total-REE grades of 358 ppm but in some locations it may be as high as 535 ppm.

== Far northern Chile ==
In Chile's far north the basin of Lauca River has been identified as hosting REE anomalies, in particular of light REE such as lanthanum, cerium, promethium and neodymium. Between the volcanoes Pomerape and Parinacota an anomalous area with high concentrations of europium, gadolinium and samarium has been found.

A portion of the Coastal Cordillera between Quebrada Camarones and Quebrada Vítor host an anomaly of samarium, gadolinium, terbium, dysprosium, holmium, erbium, thulium, yterbium and lutetium alongside highetened concentrations of copper, gold, chromium and nickel.

== See also ==
- Rare-earth industry in Australia
- China–US rare earths trade dispute
- Ukraine–United States Mineral Resources Agreement

== Bibliography ==
- Arroyo Olea, Javier; Saavedra Contreras, Viera (2023). Una defensa de cerro a mar. La lucha de Penco contra la minería de Tierras Raras: Otra cara de la transición energética (PDF) (in Spanish). Observatorio Latinoamericano de Conflictos Ambientales. p. 19.
