= IOGC =

IOGC may stand for:

- Iron oxide copper gold ore deposits (more commonly IOCG)
- Indian Oil and Gas Canada, a Canadian government agency
