= Cobriza mine =

Copper mine in Churcampa, Peru

- Location in Peru
- Location: San Pedro de Coris District, Churcampa, [Peru]]; 12°35′28″S 74°22′33″W
- Products: Copper
- Production: 20,000 tonnes copper
- Opened: 1982
- Company: Doe Run Peru S.R.L.

The Cobriza mine is a Peruvian copper mine located in San Pedro de Coris District, 72 kilometres (45 mi) north of Churcampa district in the province of Churcampa. The mine is owned by the Doe Run Peru S.R.L. On 10 July 2019, the mine was the site of a tailings dam breach of 67,488 cubic metres of water.

== See also ==
- List of copper mines
