= Cerro Blanco mine =

Titanium mine in Atacama, Chile

Location
- Location: Atacama Region, Chile

Production
- Products: Titanium

The Cerro Blanco mine is one of the largest titanium mines in Chile. The mine is located in Atacama Region. The mine has reserves amounting to 116 million tonnes of ore grading 2.1% titanium.

== See also ==
- List of mines in Chile
