= Antofagasta plc =

Chilean business

- Type: Public limited company
- Traded as: LSE: ANTO; FTSE 100 component
- ISIN: GB0000456144
- Industry: Mining
- Founded: 1888; 138 years ago
- Headquarters: London, England, UK
- Area served: Worldwide
- Key people: Jean-Paul Luksic Fontbona (Chairperson); Iván Arriagada (CEO)
- Products: Copper
- Revenue: ▲US$8,620.3 million (2025)
- Operating income: ▲US$3,426.2 million (2025)
- Net income: ▲US$2,071.3 million (2025)
- Owner: Iris Fontbona and family (65%)
- Number of employees: 29,000 (2025)
- Divisions: Antofagasta Mining; Antofagasta Transport
- Website: www.antofagasta.co.uk

Antofagasta plc is a London-based Chilean multinational conglomerate. It is one of the larger conglomerates of Chile with equity participation in Antofagasta Minerals, the railroad from Antofagasta to Bolivia, Twin Metals in Minnesota, and other exploration joint ventures in different parts from the world. Antofagasta is listed on the London Stock Exchange and is a constituent of the FTSE 100 Index.

== History ==
The Group began life as Ferrocarril de Antofagasta a Bolivia, a business that was incorporated and listed on the London Stock Exchange in 1888, with the objective of operating a railway between Antofagasta, a port on the Pacific Coast of Northern Chile, and La Paz, the capital City of Bolivia.

In 1980, the controlling stake was acquired by the Grupo Luksic, and the two businesses were subsequently integrated under the name Antofagasta Holdings.

During the 1980s, under the leadership of the managing director, Philip Adeane, Antofagasta Holdings diversified into other areas such as mining in Michilla, in which it invested in 1983, and mining in Los Pelambres, in which it invested in 1986, in addition to telecommunications.

In 1996, Antofagasta Holdings transferred its banking activities and its industrial interests to Quiñenco S.A., another diversified Chilean company also controlled by the Luksic family. This transfer allowed Antofagasta Holdings to concentrate on the development of Los Pelambres and the Tesoro mines and establish itself as a low cost copper producer. The shortened name, Antofagasta, was adopted in 1999.

The Los Pelambres mine was first recognized by William Braden in 1920. One of the largest copper deposits in the world, production in 2016 was forecast at 355–365,000 tonnes of copper, 1,275–1,559 kilogrammes of gold and 8.0–9.0 tonnes of molybdenum.

In 2009, Antofagasta PLC signed an agreement with the Australian company Carbon Energy to develop an underground coal gasification project in Mulpún, in Southern Chile. The project was put on hold in 2013.

In 2015, Antofagasta took control of Twin Metals, a US company involved in a copper and nickel mining project in Northern Minnesota. Under President Barack Obama, the US administration declined to renew the leases for the lands on which the mining project was planned. However, this position was reversed during the first Trump presidency, around 2018. The mining project commenced a long permitting process, involving significant environmental issues, being located near wilderness area with many lakes and rivers. The project's reversal of fortunes angered environmentalists and focused attention on a connection between a Chilean billionaire and President Trump's family. During this time, between 2017 and 2021, the Luksic family Washington DC mansion was let to Ivanka Trump and Jared Kushner.

In February 2016, Antofagasta signed an agreement with junior explorer Evrim Resources to earn an interest in the Ball Creek property located in British Columbia. Antofagasta can earn a 70% interest in the project by spending US$31 million over a thirteen-year period.

The company sold its idled Michilla mine in Chile for $52m in 2016. The sale included various mining properties but kept some facilities like the sulphuric acid terminal used by mines in Centinela and Antucoya (an oxide deposit near Michilla).

In 2022 Antofagasta Minerals withdrew from the Reko Diq Mine project, a joint venture it had with Barrick Gold in Pakistan. The withdrawal happened in the context of the Reko Diq case in which Pakistan paid US$900 million in indeminization to Antofagasta Minerals. Antofagasta Minerals has since stated it aims to focus its operations in the Americas.

== Operations ==
Antofagasta is one of the major international copper producers with its activities concentrated mainly in Chile where it now operates four copper mines: Los Pelambres, Centinela (previously the Esperanza and Tesoro mines), Antucoya and Zaldívar (100% owned since 2015 when Barrick Gold sold its 50% to Antofagasta).

== Ownership ==
The company is 65% owned by the Chilean Luksic family; Iris Fontbona is the matriarch.
