= 2026 Chilean wildfires =

Ongoing deadly wildfires in Chile

2026 Chile wildfires
- Part of the 2026 wildfire season
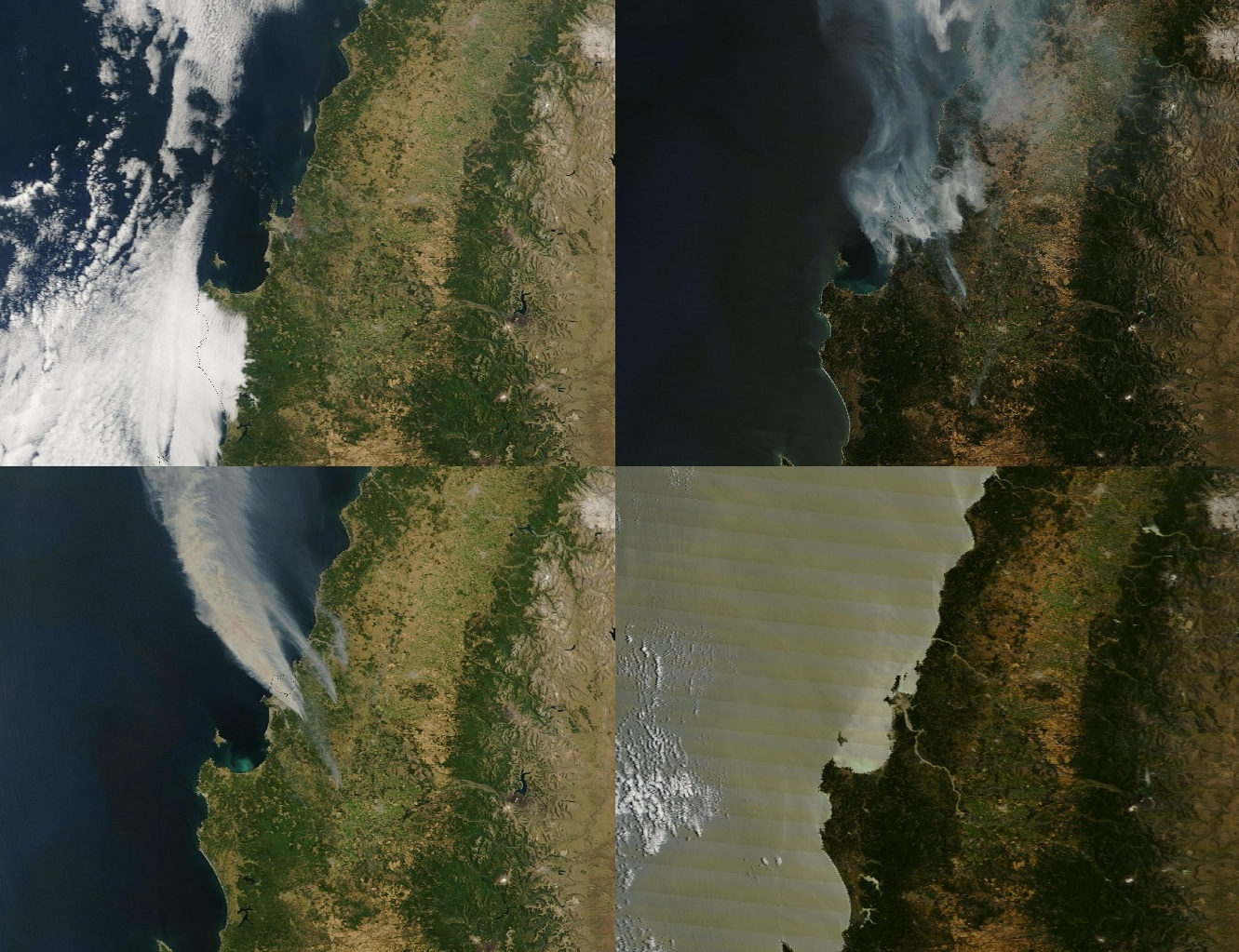
- A image of how rapidly the Trinitarias Fire grew
- Date: 16 January 2026 – 30 January 2026

Statistics
- Status: Extinguished
- Total fires: 75
- Burned area: 45,000 ha (110,000 acres)

Impacts
- Deaths: 21+
- Injuries: 75+
- Evacuated: 50,600+
- Structures destroyed: c.800

Ignition
- Cause: Under investigation

On 16 January 2026, major wildfires began burning in the Biobío and Ñuble regions of Chile. They have burned over 45,000 hectares (110,000 acres) as of 21 January 2026. The wildfires have killed 21 people and forced over 50,000 to evacuate. A total of 75 fires were reported in the region, and 33 remain active as of 20 January 2026.

The towns of Lirquén and Penco, as well as some neighborhoods of Concepción, suffered severe damage as a result of the fire. 325 homes were destroyed, 300 in Biobío and 25 in Ñuble. Chilean president Gabriel Boric declared a state of catastrophe in Biobío and Ñuble and promised government support.

== Background ==
The region had been experiencing extreme heat prior to the fires, with temperatures exceeding 38 °C (100 °F). Immediately prior to the fires breaking out, temperatures reached 28 °C (82 °F) and winds blew at speeds of 40–50 kilometres per hour (25–31 mph). The adverse conditions also delayed firefighting and rescue efforts until the morning.

== Fires ==
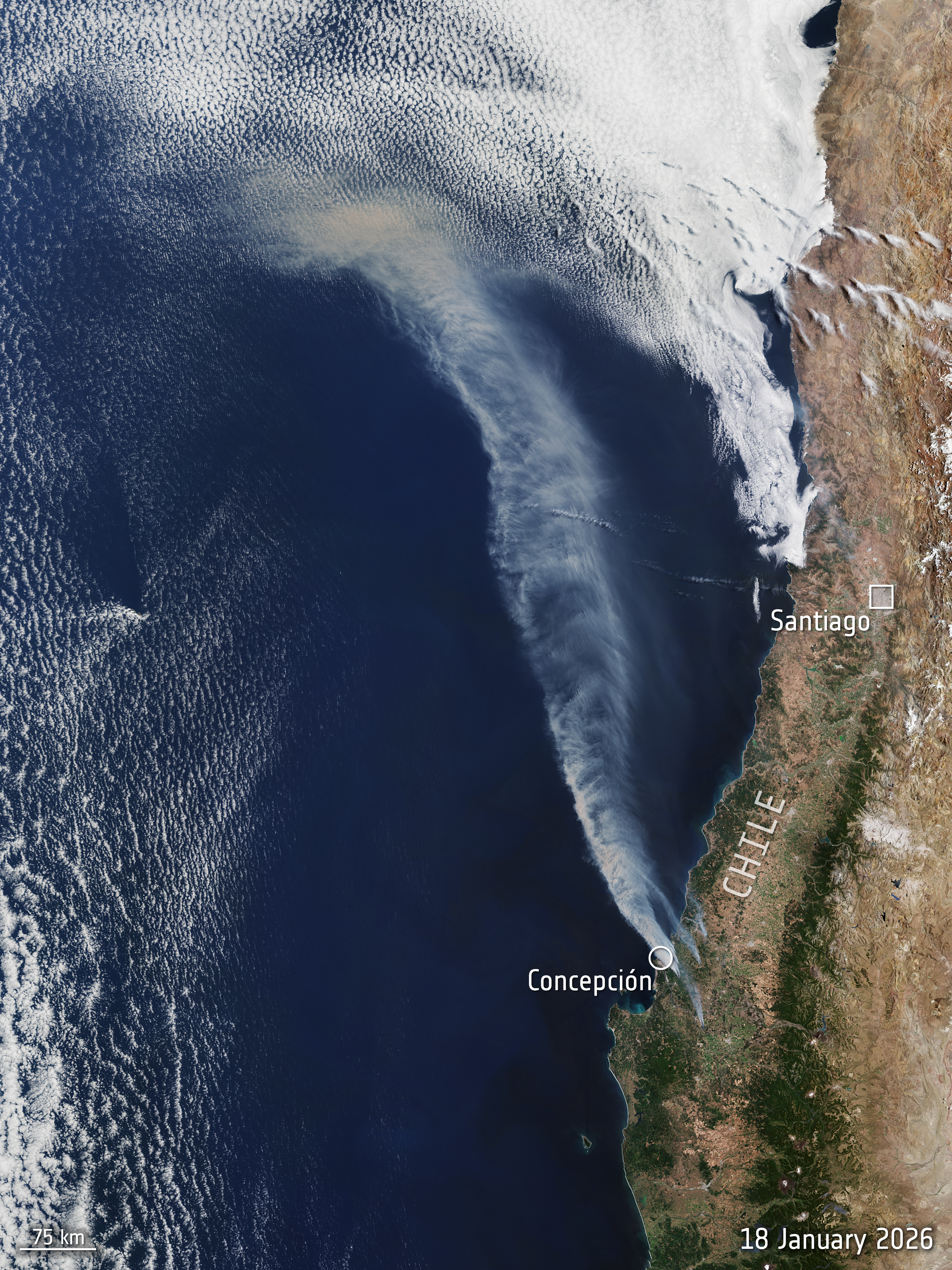
Satellite imagery of the Chilean wildfires on 18 January, seen by Sentinel-3

A series of wildfires broke out across the regions of Biobío and Ñuble on 16 January 2026, causing at least 21 fatalities, injuring 75 others and destroying at least 800 structures and multiple vehicles. More than 50,600 people were forced to evacuate. During firefighting efforts in Angol, a group of criminals attacked a fire engine.

== Aftermath ==
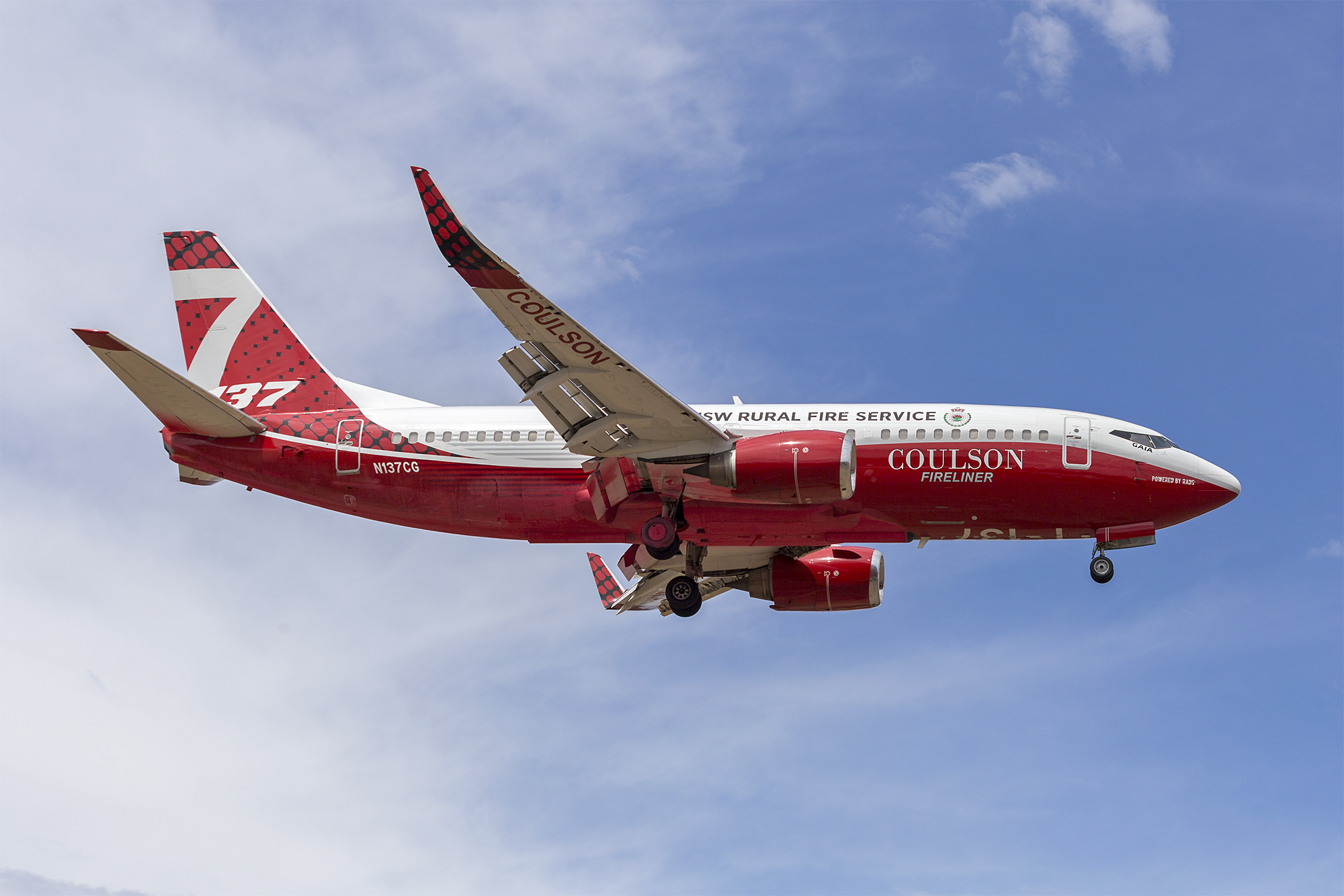
N137CG, the Coulson Aviation-Boeing 737 FireLiner in the footage, pictured with a different livery in 2019

The fires destroyed much of the coastal town of Lirquén and parts of Penco, both part of the Concepción metropolitan area. Eighteen fatalities were reported in Biobío, while another occurred in Ñuble. More than 630 people were sheltering in nine active shelters, and 1,500 were left homeless.

At least 61 people were injured in Biobío, and 14 in Ñuble, all of whom have been treated at medical facilities. 20,000 people suffered property damage and about 800 houses were destroyed.

Authorities were also evaluating damage to about 140 homes in Ñuble. Concepción was threatened by advancing fires, and some structures were destroyed on the outskirts of the city. The largest fire, Trinitarias, had burned more than 23-kilometre (14 mi) and threatened more than 3,000 houses and a gas plant.

Drone footage showed six body bags on a road, a Coulson Aviation Boeing 737–300 putting out a fire and dozens of burned houses and vehicles. A state of emergency was declared in the two regions by President Gabriel Boric. Nearly 3,000 firefighters were deployed. Authorities reported 75 wildfires in the region, and 33 remained active as of 20 January 2026. The fires have burned over 45,000 acres as of 21 January 2026.

The Chilean government's reaction to the fires has been criticized by various local politicians and mayors as slow. Rodrigo Vera, the mayor of Penco, said "from the bottom of my heart, I have been here for four hours" and that his town was burning without government presence.

Investigations Police of Chile (PDI), arrested a 39 year old Chilean man who was a caretaker of a rural property on suspicion unintentionally starting the fire. The prosecutor's theory is that it started from a wood-burning stove, which caused a 0.2 hectares (0.49 acres) fire called "Buen Retiro", which embers had traveled and started the Trinitarias Fire. Prosecutors charged him with an infraction of the Forestry Law, 20 counts of quasi-criminal homicide, and 14 counts of quasi-criminal serious injuries.

Compensation for victims will range from $700 to $1,500, according to a government statement.

The NGO Corporación Parque Para Penco have accused that Aclara Resources was implicated in the fires with the aim to facilitate its rare-earth mining project in Penco. As a background to the accusation it was noted that National Forest Corporation had rejected the mining project for its impact on the tree species Citronella mucronata and that fires allegedly began in areas of native forest within the scope of the mining project. Aclara Resources denies the accusations.

== Individual fires ==
As of 25 January 2026 at 23:40 UTC (20:40 CLST (local time)).

Name	Area burned	Region	Status
Trinitarias	15,541 ha (38,400 acres)	Biobío	Active
Rancho Chico	7,231 ha (17,870 acres)	Biobío	Active
Perales Biobío	5,100 ha (13,000 acres)	Ñuble	Active
Rucahue Sur	4,123 ha (10,190 acres)	Biobío	Active
San Lorenzo	3,968 ha (9,810 acres)	Biobío	Active
Alboyanco	1,945 ha (4,810 acres)	La Araucania	Active
Monte Negro	1,500 ha (3,700 acres)	Ñuble	Active
Codihue	856 ha (2,120 acres)	La Araucania	Active
Bolilche	668.9 ha (1,653 acres)	La Araucania	Controlled
El Cardal	666.9 ha (1,648 acres)	Ñuble	Controlled
San Cruz Pan Grande	657 ha (1,620 acres)	La Araucania	Active
Rahuil Bajo	500 ha (1,200 acres)	Ñuble	Active

== See also ==
- 2024 Chile wildfires
