= El Soldado =

- Location within Chile
- Location: Nogales, Valparaíso Region, Chile; 32°38′58.34″S 71°6′33.96″W
- Products: Copper
- Production: 39,500 tonnes copper
- Financial year: 2023
- Company: Anglo American Sur

El Soldado (lit. "The Soldier") is an open pit copper mine located in Valparaíso Region in Central Chile. It lies 132 kilometres (82 mi) northwest of Santiago near the locality of El Melón in the commune of Nogales in mountainous terrain at 600 m asl. In 2023 the mine produced 39,500 tonnes of copper, and operated with a staff of 631 persons and 1,068 contractors. It is one of several copper mines owned or partly owned by Anglo American in Chile, the other being Collahuasi and Los Bronces. The mine has as of 2025 faced the challenge of processing ores of increasingly lower grades.

Mining in El Soldado dates back at least to the early 19th century and in 1842 the first mining concession was issued for El Soldado. The current major shareholder, Anglo American, took control of the mine in 2002. In 2023 the mine renwed environmental permits allowing for operations to continue until 2027.

El Soldado operated as an exclusively underground mine until 1989 when open-pit mining begun, and then it turned in 2010 into a full surface mine as underground mining ended that year.

The mine improved its mineral processing capacities the addition of a plant for solvent extraction and electrowinning (SX/EW) in 1994. In 2023 the mine had advanced plans to implement Bulk Ore Sorting technology.

The mine holds The Copper Mark environmental certificate.

Geologically the ore deposit of El Soldado is stratabound copper and is thus similar to the deposits of Michilla, Mantos Blancos and Lo Aguirre.
