= Adrianitas =

Iron mine in Chile

- Location within Atacama Region Location within Chile

Location
- Location: Atacama Region, Chile; 27°10′15″S 70°22′46″W

Production
- Products: Iron

History
- Opened: 1960
- Closed: c. 1968

Adrianitas is a closed iron mine in northern Chile about 21 km north-north west of the city of Copiapó. It lies between the iron mines of Cerro Negro Norte and Cerro Imán. The ore of the mine is one of various iron oxide-apatite (IOA) ores that are part of the north–south Chilean Iron Belt. Mitsubishi Corporation purchased Adrianitas from Raúl Buenaventura, a former associate of Andrés Andai, in 1958. This proved underwhelming for Mitsubishi as there was no mineral reserve estimation at the time of the sale and Mitsubishi's later exploration showed them to be much smaller than originally thought. The company that emerged from the investment Compañía Minera Atacama begun mining the deposit in 1960 exporting the ore from the port of Calderillas. Mining ended in the late 1960s.

In May 2009 Leonardo Farkas' Compañía Minera Santa Fe was approved for the processing of waste rock dumps at the mine.

The ore deposit of Adrianitas is classified as medium-size by the National Geology and Mining Service. The ore of Adrianita appear as veins, breccia chimneys and in part as a bag of irregular shape. The iron ore is made of magnetite albeit gold and the copper minerals of chalcopyrite and chrysocolla have also been described in the deposit.

The mine is named after Las Adrianitas, two young prostitutes murdered in 1936 in Copiapó who are now revered as folk saints.
