= The Copper Mark =

Sustainability certification mark

The Copper Mark is a certification mark within the mining industry that assures that the production in a particular mine or ancillary facility is aligned with the United Nations sustainable development goals. The certificate is granted after approval in independent third-party assessment in 33 items divided into three categories; governance, social and environmental. The Copper Mark was created by the International Copper Association.

As of September 2022 the following mines in Chile hold The Copper Mark; Escondida, Spence, El Abra, Los Bronces, El Soldado, Antucoya, Centinela and Zaldívar. In addition, the copper smelter of Chagres also has the certification.
