= Capstone Copper =

Canadian mining company

- Type: Private
- Traded as: ASX: CSC; OTCID Basic: CSCCF; TSX: CS
- Industry: Copper
- Genre: Mining
- Predecessors: Capstone Mining; Mantos Copper
- Founded: 2022
- Headquarters: Vancouver, Canada
- Area served: Chile, Mexico, United States
- Key people: John MacKenzie (CEO); Darren Pylot (EC)
- Website: capstonecopper.com

Capstone Copper is a Canadian mining company based in Vancouver. Its assets include the mines of; Mantoverde and Mantos Blancos in Chile, Cozamin in Mexico and Pinto Valley in Arizona, United States. It runs also the mining projects of Copper Cities and Santo Domingo in Arizona and Chile respectively. Santo Domingo is Capstone Copper's first greenfield exploration project in Chile.

The company formed in March 2022 from the merger of Capstone Mining and the Bermudas-based Mantos Copper. In the merger Capstone Mining owners kept 61% of the stakes of the new company while Mantos Copper owners kept the remaining 39%.

Copper mining is the main focus of the company albeit it also mines gold, silver, zinc and molybdenum as by-products. The mines of Mantoverde and Santo Domingo are thought to be able to provide battery-grade cobalt.

== See also ==
- Canadian mining in Latin America and the Caribbean
- Copper mining in Chile
- Copper mining in the United States
