= Andes Iron =

Chilean mining company

- Company type: Private
- Industry: Iron & Copper
- Genre: Mining
- Founded: 2010
- Headquarters: Las Condes, Santiago, Chile
- Number of locations: Dominga, Coquimbo Region; Cerro Imán, Atacama Region
- Owner: Family of Carlos Alberto Délano (75%)

Andes Iron is a Chilean exploration and mining company with two major projects in Chile. The Dominga project is a proposed open-pit copper mine with accompanying processing plant, desalination plant, slurry pipelines and an export port. The company is controlled by Chilean businessman Carlos Alberto Délano. Andes Irón owns 22% of the mining company Minería Activa, and together both have an exploration project at Cerro Imán.

== History ==
=== Planning ===
Minería Activa Uno Spa began investing in the prospecting phase for new mines in 2008. Mediterráneo Fondo de Inversión (FIP), the largest investor of Minería Activa Uno Spa, agreed with establishing a mine at the Santa Dominga Norte y Sur area in the town of La Higuera.

In 2009, Chilean businessman, presidential candidate and soon-to-be president of Chile Sebastián Piñera began to invest in Andes Iron through Mediterráneo Fondo de Inversión (FIP) according to Radio Bío-Bío.

The project was quickly challenged by environmentalists, including the marine conservation organisation Oceana, for its potential to impact the Humboldt Penguin National Reserve and the wider marine ecology of the area, which they describe as a marine biodiversity hotspot. The project's environmental license was rejected in 2017.

=== Approval ===
The government of President Sebastián Piñera, who was elected for a second non-consecutive term, successfully appealed the rejection of Dominga's environmental license and the company was expected to start work on the Dominga project by 2020. The company stated that it would be prepared to concede its proposed port at Totoralillo, Coquimbo if Compañía Minera del Pacífico, a subsidiary of Chilean iron producer CAP, was permitted to construct their proposed Cruz Grande port nearby.

=== Pandora Papers ===
In the Pandora Papers leak of 3 October 2021, President Piñera was named in the revealed documents. According to Spanish newspaper El País, Chilean media organizations CIPER and LaBot allegedly documented that Piñera was involved in "particularly controversial activity". The Pandora leak reported that Piñera sold Minera Dominga to his friend since childhood, Carlos Alberto Délano, shortly after entering the presidency in 2010. It was reported that a small transaction was first made in Chile while two subsequently larger payments were made in the British Virgin Islands.

In response to the leak, Piñera's business manager said that Piñera had not been in control of his own companies for about twelve years and that he was not aware of the sale of Minera Dominga to his friend Carlos Alberto Délano.

== Ownership ==
The company's other project, Iman, is a prospective iron ore mine. It is owned in a 50-50 partnership with Minería Activa. Andes Iron is majority owned by the Delano Mendez family (74%), with minor interests held by the Garcez Silva family (14%), and the company's directors (11%).
