= Lo Aguirre =

Copper mine in Chile

- Location within Chile
- Location: Santiago Metropolitan Region, Chile; 33°26′46.77″S 70°55′16.77″W
- Products: Copper
- Opened: 1980
- Closed: 2000
- Company: Nueva Pudahuel

Lo Aguirre is a medium-sized copper mine located west of Santiago in central Chile. The copper deposit is of stratabound type and formed during a time of extensional tectonics in what is now the Chilean Coast Range in the Jurassic and Cretaceous. The mile lies at elevation between 500 and 700 m a.s.l. In the late 1980s Lo Aguirre became a commercial solvent-extraction-based operation using bioleaching. It became Chile's first mine to achieve this despite a previous attempt at Chuquicamata in the early 1970s. The mine begun operations in November 1980 and closed in 2000 but the procedures associated to the closure lasted until 2016. The mine was known for being the mine that was closest to Chile's capital Santiago.

The mine existed in the 18th century when Jesuits mined copper oxides from it. Mining and exploration activity in it started again in 1865 and lasted until 1924. In the last eight years of activity the mine was owned by Santiago Mining Co, a subsidiary of Anaconda Copper.

There are three main mineralized orebodies in Lo Aguirre known as Principal, Amanda and Milagro. Geologically the ore deposit of Lo Aguirre is similar to the deposits of Michilla, Mantos Blancos and El Soldado.
