= Punta del Cobre Formation =

Geologic formation in Chile

- Stratigraphic range: Early Cretaceous
- Type: Geologic formation
- Unit of: Bandurrias Group
- Underlies: Abundancia Formation (Chañarcillo Group)

Lithology
- Primary: Massive andesite and dacite, volcaniclastic basaltic andesite and basalt

Location
- Coordinates: 27°28′56″S 70°15′57″W
- Region: Atacama Region
- Country: Chile
- Punta del Cobre Formation (Chile)

Punta del Cobre Formation (Spanish: Formación Punta del Cobre) is a geologic formation of Early Cretaceous age cropping out in the interior of Atacama Region, Chile. The formation is of Early Cretaceous age. It is made of massive volcanic rocks, chiefly andesite, dacite, and volcaniclastic rocks representing "flows" and Volcanic breccia of basaltic andesitic and basaltic composition. The rocks of the formation belong to the calc-alkaline magma series. Rocks show intense hydrothermal alteration and hosts significant copper and gold deposits and lesser amounts of zinc and silver. The formation lies in a zone of small-scale mining that supplies the nearby Fundición Paipote copper smelter. The copper and iron ores of the Candelaria mine and Dominga prospect are at least in part emplaced in Punta del Cobre Formation.

It was by 1980 considered to be part of Chañarcillo Group but was by 2001 considered to more likely represent the lower member of the underlying Bandurrias Group. The upper boundary of Punta del Cobre Formation is marked by the appearance of an alternation of beds of carbonate and volcaniclastic rocks belonging to the Abundancia Formation of Chañarcillo Group. The contact is transitional with the first appearance of carbonate beds indicating the beginning of Abundancia Formation.

Geologists Rober Marschik and Lluís Fontboté divided the formation in 2001 into two members, the Geraldo-Negro Member and the overlying the Algarrobos Member. The former is contain massive volcanic rocks, and the latter the volcaniclastic rocks.
