= El Pilar mine =

- Location: Sonora, Mexico
- Products: Copper

The El Pilar mine is a large proposed copper mine in Sonora, Mexico. El Pilar is one of the largest copper reserves in Mexico and the world having estimated reserves of 685.8 million tonnes of ore grading 0.28% copper. As of 2021, the mine is planned to produce 36,000 tonnes a year starting in 2023.

The mine is 2 kilometers away from the Santa Cruz River, a railroad and local roads. Electricity is available in Nogales, 28 kilometers away from the site. It is located 15 kilometers south of the international border with the USA.

The feasibility study was managed by the then-owner of the project Recursos Stingray de Cobre (Stingray Copper), which was acquired by Southern Copper Corporation (SCC) in 2015.

== See also ==
- El Arco mine
- Buenavista mine
