= Iván Arriagada =

Chilean businessman (born 1963)

- Born: Iván Dagoberto Arriagada Herrera; October 1963 (age 62)
- Education: London School of Economics
- Occupation: businessman
- Title: CEO, Antofagasta PLC
- Term: April 2016-
- Spouse: Maria Isabel Barcelo
- Children: 4

Iván Dagoberto Arriagada Herrera (born October 1963) is a Chilean businessman, and the CEO of Antofagasta PLC.

Arriagada has a master's degree from the London School of Economics.

Arriagada has been CEO of Antofagasta PLC since April 2016.
