= LarrainVial =

Chilean financial company

LarrainVial is a Chilean financial company founded in 1934 by brothers Fernando and Leonidas Larrain Vial. Initially, it focused in stock brokerage and financial advisory, and over time, expanded its services to asset management, fund administration and investment advice both locally and internationally. Currently, the company has operations in Chile, Peru, Colombia, Mexico and the United States, and is one of the main stockbrokers and asset managers in the region.

== History ==
The history of LarrainVial begins in 1934 with its creation as one of the first stock brokerages in Chile. In 1960, in alliance with the American bank Paine Webber, they began to venture into the purchase and sale of foreign currencies. During the 90s, LarrainVial expanded its international presence, especially with operations on the New York Stock Exchange, and in 1998 they launched their first mutual fund. In the 2000s, the company consolidated its role as a pioneer in the distribution of international financial products, such as its first SICAV fund in Luxembourg. In recent years, LarrainVial has continued its international expansion, with a presence in emerging markets such as Mexico and Central America, and expanding its portfolio with alternative asset and venture capital products.

== Business lines ==
LarrainVial operates in various areas within the financial field, including stock brokerage, investment fund management, and financial advice to large net worth individuals. One of its main focuses is the distribution of third-party financial products (DP3), allowing institutional investors to access a wide range of alternative asset products. The company has also developed an important fund management business, with LarrainVial Asset Management and Activos AGF at the head of its management, both in fixed income and alternative funds. Additionally, the company has expanded its presence in markets such as the United States and Mexico, focusing on wealth management and the distribution of international financial products.

=== Minería Activa ===
Among its investment funds is Minería Activa, in which Andes Iron owns 22% of the stakes. Minería Activa is involved in the iron mining projects of Dominga and Cerro Imán. Minería Activa controls Pampa Camarones, a mining company that operates Golondrina, a copper mine in Arica y Parinacota Region in northernmost Chile.

From at least 2016 to 2019 Minería Activa administered the LarrainVial fund FIP Lantánidos which owned BioLantánidos, a company that planned to mine rare-earths near Penco. In 2021 BioLantánidos, by then fully owned by Hochschild Mining, was rebranded to Aclara Resources. As of March 2026 the Penco project (Penco Module) had its environmental impact assessment under evaluation by the Environmental Assessment Service.

== Controversies ==
LarrainVial has been involved in various controversies in recent years, some of great magnitude that have affected its image and generated judicial investigations and sanctions. One of the most notorious cases was the "Cascades Case", where the company and several of its executives were sanctioned for tax fraud. This case involved irregular financial maneuvers related to the management of companies controlled by Julio Ponce Lerou. The Superintendency of Securities and Insurance (SVS) imposed million-dollar fines on LarrainVial executives, including Leonidas Vial, one of the firm's controllers. Although the sanctions were later partially revoked by the Chilean Supreme Court in 2024, the case severely affected the company's reputation.

Another case that has recently caused controversy is the "Hermosilla Case", where a series of audios were leaked in which lawyers and businessmen discussed bribes and kickbacks related to financial disputes. In these audios, LarrainVial was mentioned in relation to a legal dispute between the firm and a partner of the company. Factop, a factoring company in which LarrainVial was financially involved. The scandal gained public relevance due to the implications of corruption and unethical practices, which led the Prosecutor's Office to investigate the content of the audios.

Furthermore, in January 2024, it was revealed that a company director, Leonardo Suarez, called a government advisor, Cristóbal Huneeus Lagos, during a debate on the pension reform in Chile. Huneeus later said he was a "good friend" of Suarez. The leak of this information raised suspicions of possible conflicts of interest, since the reform would directly affect pension funds, one of LarrainVial's business areas.

In March 2024, the National Economic Prosecutor's Office (FNE) filed charges against LarrainVial for alleged "interlocking" practices, accusing the company of maintaining directors in several competing entities, which could violate competition rules in the financial market. In April 2025, the Tribunal for the Defense of Free Competition (TDLC) issued its first ruling in Chile on this matter, imposing fines on LarrainVial, Consorcio Financiero, and Juan Hurtado Vicuña that, together, exceeded CLP 2.5 billion (approximately 1,889 UTA in the case of LarrainVial). The court held that interlocking constitutes a per se infringement, without the need to demonstrate anticompetitive effects. Appeals are still pending before the Supreme Court, so the decision is not final.

In August 2025, the Financial Market Commission (CMF) fined LarrainVial Activos S.A. Administradora General de Fondos 60,000 UF (approximately CLP 2.35 billion) in connection with the “Fondo Corneta” of the Factop case. The regulator concluded that the manager induced investors to acquire shares through misleading information, presenting the assets as participation in Grupo Patio when, in fact, they were distressed loans linked to companies controlled by Antonio Jalaff. Several former directors and executives of the firm were also fined individually. The CMF announced that it would refer the case to the Public Prosecutor’s Office for consideration of possible criminal proceedings.
