= Bellavista mine =

Iron mine in Chile

- Location within Atacama Region Location within Chile

Location
- Location: Atacama Region, Chile; 27°15′01″S 70°24′02″W

Production
- Products: Iron

History
- Closed: 2021

Bellavista is an iron mine in Atacama Region, Chile. It lies 2 km northeast of the Cerro Imán iron mine and is part of a wider geological region and mining district known as the Chilean Iron Belt. The mine was operated by Santa Fe Mining under a lease agreement until it was paralyzed by the COVID-19 pandemic in Chile in 2021 and its lease was then prematurely ended. The mine has been mentioned in 2011 by CAP as the first new user of the mining port of Punta Totoralillo after the expansion of the said port.
