= Sociedad Nacional de Minería =

Boletín Minero
- Categories: Trade magazine
- Frequency: Monthly (1883–present)
- First issue: December 15, 1883; 141 years ago
- Company: Sociedad Nacional de Minería
- Country: Chile
- Language: Spanish
- Website: www.sonami.cl/v2/centro-de-documentacion/boletin-minero/

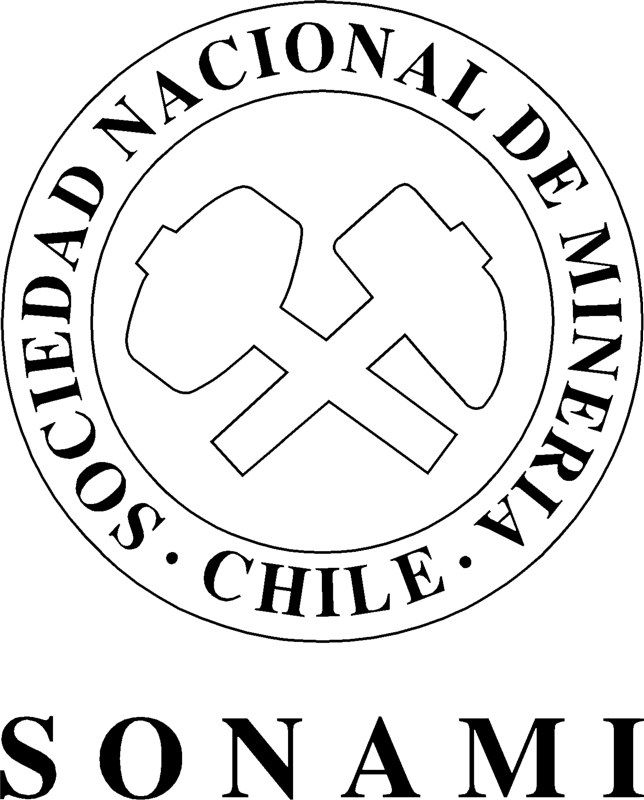
Seal and logotype of SONAMI.

Sociedad Nacional de Minería (lit. National Mining Society) or SONAMI is a guild grouping mining companies operating in Chile. With 76 member companies listed as of 2025 it is more inclusive than Consejo Minero which groups only the 16 largest mining companies. SONAMI was established in 1883 during a time when gold, silver and copper mining in Chile were experiencing a decline.

SONAMI declares its objectives to be to promote mining activity, represent the interests of its member in Chile and abroad and to offer information services.

The society publishes the newsletter Boletín Minero since 1883. SONAMI has been involved in the shaping of Chilean legislation on various moments in history such as the Chilean Mining Code of 1888, the Chilean Law on Mining Concessions in the 1980s and the 2003 DS 76 decree of the Ministry of Mining.

The San Lorenzo Prize (Premio San Lorenzo) is awarded by SONAMI each year to people or institutions who contribute to mining in Chile. It is named after Saint Lawrence the patron saint of miners and is awarded on the Day of the Miner which is the feast day of Saint Lawrence. Some recipients are:

- 2023: Enrique Merino Cortés; Planta Delta and Faena Tambo de Oro.
- 2022: Planta Magnetita

== See also ==
- Codelco, a Chilean state-owned copper mining company
- ENAMI, a Chilean state-owned mining services company
- Hernán Videla Lira, president of SONAMI from 1937 to 1965
- Pirquinero, artisanal miner in Chile and neighbouring countries

== Bibliography ==
- Ulloa Urrutia, Alfie; Contreras Biekert, José Luis; Gana Aravena, Joaquín; Miranda Toledo, Rodrigo; Chauveau Gerber, Paul; Villalobos Valenzuela, Fernando; Farías Soto, Javiera (2017). Productividad en la Gran Minería del Cobre (in Spanish). Comisión Nacional de Productividad. ISBN 978-956-7725-08-3.
