= Mantos Blancos =

Copper mine in Antofagasta, Chile

Mantos Blancos mine
- Location within Antofagasta Region Location within Chile
- Location: Antofagasta Region, Chile; 23.4315°S 70.0572°W
- Products: Copper
- Opened: 1912
- Company: Capstone Copper

The Mantos Blancos is a copper mine located in northern Chile in Antofagasta Region. It lies about 45 to 50 km northeast of the port city of Antofagasta. It lies next to Chile route 25 that connects Antofagasta with Calama. It does also lie short distance from the Antofagasta-Bolivia railway.

The mine is owned by Capstone Copper, a company based in Vancouver that also owns Mantoverde mine 360 km to the south. Previously, the mine was fully owned by Anglo American plc.

The mine submitted an environmental impact assessment study in June 2026 for the expansion of copper sulfide and copper oxide processing capacity, the expansion of the santa Bárbara pit and the creation of new tailing dams. This cosiders also the expansion of the copper oxide precessing capacity, The project considers an investment of US$ 500 million and aims to extend the mine operations until 2041.

In June 2026 Christian Caviedes replaced Jaime rivera as general manager of the mine.

== Geology ==
The ore of the mine is mainly made of chrysocolla and atacamite found in joints and other fractures as well as disseminated. The host rocks of the ore is andesite and dacite. The main gangue minerals are halite (salt), gypsum and calcium carbonates.

As of 1968 the main ore bodies of the mine were Quinta-Tercera, Mercedes-Pabla, Elvira and Marina. Each of these bodies is 360 to 200 meters long and have a breadth between 120 and 90 m. All of these orebodies are found in a 2.4 km long and 0.75 km broad area.

Geologically the ore deposit of Mantos Blancos is stratabound copper and is thus similar to the deposits of Michilla, El Soldado and Lo Aguirre.

== 1912–2000 history ==
A rudimentary mining operation was carried in Mantos Blancos starting in 1912 when local businessan Carlos de la Fuente Zavala obtained mining property in the area. The geology of Mantos Blancos was unfavourable to the methods of the time given its low grades and the irregular pattern of the mineralization. Moritz Hochschild purchased Mantos Blancos from de la Fuente Zavala in 1952 through one of his companies. Operations in started anew in 1953 and in 1955 the mining operations was reorganized into the company Empresa Minera Mantos Blancos S.A.. Empresa Minera Mantos Blancos or EMABLOS was established with foreign capital and investments of the Chilean state through the Production Development Corporation (CORFO). EMABLOS begun the construction of a new mineral processing plant in 1958 and its operations started in 1961. The ore processed at the time had soluble copper grades of 1.9%. By 1968 the mine employed a workforce of 1200 employees.

== See also ==
- Copper mining in Chile
- List of mines in Chile

== Bibliography ==
- Millán, Augusto (2006). La minería metálica en Chile en el siglo XX [Metal Mining in Chile in the Twentieth Century] (in Spanish). Santiago de Chile: Editorial Universitaria. ISBN 956-11-1849-1.
- Joseph, Werner (1968). Las operaciones de Mantos Blancos. Apartado Revista Cuprum (in Spanish).
