= Inca de Oro mine =

Coordinates: 26°45′20″S 69°54′16″W

- Interactive map of Inca de Oro mine
- Location: Atacama Region, Chile
- Products: Copper

The Inca de Oro mine is a large copper mine located in northern Chile in Atacama Region. Inca de Oro represents one of the largest copper reserves in Chile and in the world having estimated reserves of 769.7 million tonnes of ore grading 0.36% copper.

== See also ==
- Dulcinea mine
