= El Arco mine =

- Location within Baja California Sur Location within Mexico
- Location: Baja California Sur, Mexico; 28.057°N 113.460°W
- Products: Copper
- Company: Grupo México

The El Arco mine is a planned large copper mine located in the north-west of Mexico in Baja California. El Arco represents one of the largest copper reserve in Mexico and in the world having estimated reserves of 1.5 billion tonnes of ore grading 0.41% copper. As of 2021, the mine is planned to produce 190,000 tons of copper a year starting in 2027.

In 2021, Grupo México announced a $3.1 billion investment for metals refining and power infrastructure to power the future mine. In 2024, Baja California Sur officials asked for the project to be stopped based on the ecological destruction the development of the mine would create.

== See also ==
- Buenavista mine
- El Pilar mine
