= Shaida copper mine =

Copper mine in Herat, Afghanistan

Shaida Copper Mine
- Shaida Copper Mine
- Coordinates: 33°47′24″N 61°49′30″E
- Country: Afghanistan
- Province: Herat Province
- District: Adraskan District

Area
  - Total: 97 sq mi (250 km^{2})
- Elevation: 4,406 ft (1,343 m)
- Time zone: + 4.30

From 1971 to 1972, Soviet exploration work was carried out on the extent of the mine. Additional work was carried out by USGS in 2005 including airborne surveys, hyperspectral surveys and analysis, and the compilation of prior data into a GIS database. The USGS reports that in the larger USGS defined Dusar-Shaida Area of Interest, there has been some mining. However, there is no known historic production from the Shaida licence area. The mine is estimated to contain five million tonnes of copper.

== Geology ==
Shaida's mineralisation has been described as a porphyry copper deposit. During the exploration continuous drilled intervals of mineralisation were identified, with copper grades between 0.10 and 0.80%, with drilled intervals ranging from 0.80 to 17.95m. Cross sections of drilling at the Shaida prospect show layered quartz plagioclase porphyry, quartz keratophyre and aleuropelites (siltstone or mudstone) interbedded with volcanic layers.

== Geography ==
The Shaida Copper Mine is situated in the western region of Afghanistan in the Adraskan District of the Herat province, 65 km South-West of the city of Herat and 50 km SSW of Gozareh. It is anticipated that Gozareh will act as the logistics city for Herat Province. Herat Airport (which became an international airport in 2012) is close to Gozareh and there is also a railroad terminus station planned at Gozareh as part of the Afghanistan Railway Development Scheme.

== Ownership ==
The deadline for submission of bids for the Shaida mineral tender was 6 August 2012. The Ministry of Mines of Afghanistan announced that on 26 November 2012, preferred bidder were selected to undertake the exploration and subsequent exploitation of Shaida Copper Mine. The selection of the preferred bidder for the mine follows an extensive process since launch in December 2011, which has been supported by transaction advisers and transparency advisers to the Ministry. The tender process for the Project is expected to culminate in the granting of an exploration license and, subject to the satisfaction of certain conditions, will lead to the granting of the requisite exploitation license.

Afghan Minerals Group (AMG) was chosen as the preferred bidder whilst Silk Road Mining & Development (SRM) was chosen as the reserve bidder. AMG has four shareholders:

- Supreme Group B.V. (67%) – a provider of logistics, supply chain and associated services, with more than 8,500 employees worldwide and group turnover of US$6 billion in 2011.
- UB Investments LLC, owned by the Khwaja family (11%) – represents multiple businesses including brands such as Black & Decker, Dewalt, D-Link, Ricoh, Sharp, Sony, Hyundai Automobiles and FedEx, owns production and storage facilities in Afghanistan and has more than 1,000 employees in Afghanistan.
- Marco Polo Holdings Ltd, owned by the Gulzar family (11%) – holds distributorships of several brand names including Kraft, Unilever, Johnson & Johnson, Philip Morris, and Toyota in Afghanistan. He also invested in a Coca-Cola bottling plant in Afghanistan.
- SAK Group FZCO, owned by Mr Haji ObaidullahSaderKhail (11%) – trades in basic food commodities and also fuel and transportation.

AMG's technical team includes Ken Haddow and David Cliff, both ex-Rio Tinto executives, and AMG have contracted Kazakhstan Minerals Company (KMC) to design and undertake their exploration and development programmes. KMC is an exploration contractor with operations throughout Russia and CIS states. KMC holds a strategic partnership with Iskander and together have a large number of drill rigs at their disposal.

A consortium of six Indian companies, which includes four state-run companies (Hindustan Copper, Steel Authority of India Ltd, National Aluminium Co. and Mineral Exploration Corp) and two from private sector( Monnet Ispat & Energy Ltd and Jindal Steel & Power Ltd), had bid for the Shaida project. SAIL led the consortium with 26 per cent stake followed by Hindustan Copper. This bid comes in after three of the four blocks of mining rights of Hajigak iron deposits, were awarded to AFISCO (Afghan Iron and Steel Consortium), a consortium led by the Steel Authority of India (SAIL) in November 2011. The Indian preference for the Shaida project appears to be due to its location and planned connectivity. The Indian consortium was looking at this rail link to move the mined copper ore to the Iranian port of Chabahar; bypassing its reliance on Pakistan. On 26 August 2012, Deputy Foreign Ministers of India, Afghanistan and Iran met ahead of NAM Summit in Tehran to discuss the utilization of Iran's Chabahar port by the Indian consortium bidding for Shaida Copper mine. The under-construction rail link to Herat would pass some 12 kilometers from the Shaida copper mine.

After AMG fell out of the bidding process, SRM was named the leading bidder and began negotiating for the contract. However, due to various leadership changes in the Afghan Government the contractual discussions were paused. Negotiations restarted in 2018 and SRM signed an exploration contract with the MoMP on September 19, 2018. On September 26, 2019 SRM received its mining license and began exploration.
