= Quebrada Blanca =

- Location within Chile
- Location: Tarapacá Region, Chile; 21°0′15.63″S 68°48′3.48″W
- Products: Copper
- Production: ▲207.8 kTons of copper
- Financial year: 2024
- Opened: 1994
- Company: Compañía Minera Quebrada Blanca: Teck Resources (60%); Sumitomo Group (30%); Codelco (10%)

Quebrada Blanca (lit. "White Ravine") is an open-pit copper mine in the Atacama Desert of northern Chile. It lies in the Andes at an altitude of 4,400 meters above sea level, 15 km west of the copper mine of Collahuasi and about 240 km southeast of the port city of Iquique. Teck Resources owns 60% of the mine, Sumitomo Metal Mining Co. and Sumitomo Corporation own together 30% of it and state-owned Codelco owns 10%.

The first known mining at Quebrada Blanca occurred at some point between 1905 and 1930 when in connection to mining at Collahuasi local miners dug small galleries to extract copper ore. In the late 1950s the area was mapped by the mining company Chilex but no exploration drillings were done as other mineral deposits in Chile were being priorized for this by the company. In 1971 the deposit was nationalized and in 1982 the property was transferred from Codelco to ENAMI, both state-owned. The development of a modern mine in the deposit was put to tender by ENAMI and in August 1989 Compañía Minera Quebrada Blanca was formed with 38.25% of the shares owned by Cominco, 29.25% by Teck, 22.5% by Cominco Resources and 10% by ENAMI.

Modern Quebrada Blanca begun production in 1994 reaching a first peak in 2009 with 87,400 tons of copper produced that year. Then, from 2015 to 2022 production remained under 40,000 tons of copper per year rising to 64,300 tons of copper in 2023 and 207,800 tons of copper in 2024 becoming thus the 8th most productive copper mine in Chile.

== QB2 expansion project ==
After years of delays, in October 2023 Quebrada Blanca inaugurated the start of a large expansion project known as Fase 2 or QB2 that had its environmental impact assessment submitted in 2016. It is one of the largest mine expansión projects worldwide and with Ex-Ante calling it "the largest mining investment [in Chile] in the last 15 years". The project has been described as part of a bid of Teck Resources to grow in the metal markets moving away from coal mining.

Among other things, the project includes the building of a new large crusher. The mine's development plan was as of 2025 lagging after schedule due to difficulties stemming from the handling of tailings. The problem with tailings storage was reported to be slowing the production rate of copper as well and requiring new investments to be solved. Other causes for delays in the implementation of the project, reduced output and project overcost include problems in the mineral processing plant and geotechnical problems.

== 2024 Codelco share purchase ==
In 2024 state-owned ENAMI sold its 10% of shares in Quebrada Blanca to Codelco. The terms of the purchase were criticized by Sociedad Nacional de Minería as lacking transparency.

Prior to the sale the 10% of shares of Quebrada Blanca were ENAMI's main asset, and its sale was aimed to capitalize the company and pay-off some of ENAMI's debts. Critics point out that shares were sold at prices below what private companies would have paid and that the sale is part of a pattern of empoverishment of ENAMI at the cost of benefitting Codelco.

In April 2026 the Comptroller General of Chile declared that no irregularities, such as conflict of interests or lack of probity, had been found in the ENAMI-Codelco deal.
