= Pampa de Pongo =

Coordinates: 15.3971°S 74.8369°W

Located in Arequipa, Peru, Pampa de Pongo is an iron reserve which is in exploration stage. Jinzhao Mining Peru S.A is the company which owns the project. The development of the project comprises, besides iron ore production activities, the development of a port and the respective transmission lines to supply power to the project activities.

A Preliminary Economic Assessment Technical Report was executed in 2008 finding that the Project, besides being located at a favourable location near a port facility, has a presence of a large magnetite mineralized.

== Ownership ==
Pampa de Pongo was until October 2008 own by Cardero Resource Corp, on Oct 27th 2008 Cardero sold 100% to Nanjinzhao Group Co. Ltd. for US$200 million.

On December 18, 2009, Nanjinzhao Group Co. Ltd. made the final payment to Cardero Resource Corp. Jinzhao Mining PeruS.A. is the Peruvian subsidiary of Zibo Hongda Mining Co., Ltd. which is a subsidiary of Nanjinzhao Group Co.

== Studies ==
Feasibilities studies for Pampa de Pongo project were finalised on 2013 by SNC Lavalin.

Engineering and consulting firm Zer Geosystem Peru, specialised in offering Geotechnical studies, used the Multichannel Analysis of Spectral Waves (MASW) methods for both Pampa de Pongo and Sombrerillo substations as well as for the respective port in order to execute the respective geophysical surveys.

== Power ==
On Nov 20th 2014, the project received the EIA approval for the construction of transmission lines by Peruvian Ministry of Energy and Mining according to directorial resolution Nº365-2014-MEM/DGAAE.
