= Carmen Arriagada =

Chilean writer

Carmen Arriagada García
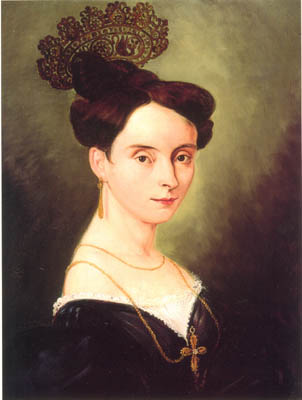
- Painting of Carmen Arriagada
- Born: 1807; Chillán Viejo, Ñuble Region
- Died: June 16, 1900 (aged 92–93); Talca, Maule Region
- Occupation: writer
- Spouse: Eduardo Gutike

Carmen Arriagada García (1807 – June 16, 1900) was a Chilean writer.

== Biography ==
Arriagada García was born in Chillán Viejo, Ñuble Region, 1807, of an aristocratic family. She was the daughter of Pedro Ramón Arriagada, a public figure, and Maria Antonia Garcia. She was educated in Santiago and married a German military man, Eduardo Gutike. After her father died, she moved with her husband to Linares on lands she inherited from her father. Later they moved to Talca, where she lived until the time of her death. She carried on a relationship for almost 16 years, though letters, with the German Romantic painter, Johann Moritz Rugendas, who arrived in Chile in 1834. They met at the home of Isidora Zegers in Talca. Her letters, not necessarily private, but rather meant to be shared among friends and family, were written in French and English. His last letter to her was in 1849, while her last letter to him was in 1851. The collection of love letters is held by Museo Histórico O'Higginiano. She died in Talca, Maule Region, June 16, 1900.
