= Dominga =

Mining project in the commune of La Higuera, Chile

Coordinates: 29.369°S 71.192°W

Dominga is a copper and iron ore prospect and mine project located in northern Chile. The ores of Dominga are found in volcanic and plutonic rocks of the Punta del Cobre Formation and the "Dioritic Complex," respectively. The controversial nature of the Dominga mine project stems from an alleged conflict of interest involving former president Sebastián Piñera and Carlos Alberto Délano, a Chilean magnate and friend of Piñera. The purchase agreement for Dominga included a provision stating that the final payment would only be made if no new environmental protection area was established near the mine. This clause created a conflict of interest for Piñera. The details of this agreement were only made public with the release of the Pandora Papers in 2021.

Furthermore, the project has faced criticism on environmental grounds due to concerns that it poses a threat to the nearby Pingüino de Humboldt National Reserve.

== See also ==
- Andes Iron
- Copper mining in Chile
- Iron mining in Chile
- Minería Activa
