= Law on Mining Concessions =

The Chilean Organic Constitutional Law on Mining Concessions (Spanish: Ley Orgánica Constitucional sobre Concesiones Mineras) distinguishes two types of mining concessions exploratory concessions and exploitation concessions. The law was submitted in August 1981 by Augusto Pinochet to the Government Junta which was the legislative body of the dictatorship. It was approved on January 7 and rectified on January 22 and 23 of 1982. José Piñera, who was minister of mining in 1980 and 1981, declared the Law on Mining Concessions together with the Chilean Mining Code were done to give "free access" and "judicial security" to private investors.

Key articles of the law state that:

- Both exploratory and exploitation concessions are real rights distinct and independent of the real estate on the surface (Article 2).
- There is no depth limit on the concessions (Article 3).
- The owners of a concession are the only ones entitled to sample and dig in the concession. Limitations to sampling and digging can be established when the sampling or digging causes damages to the surface real estate owner or the public interest (Article 7).
- Owners of concessions have to pay annual patents to the state, if not concessions are auctioned (Articles 12 and 18).
- Exploration concession are cancelled if exploitation is carried out on them (Articles 13 and 18).
- The owners of the concessions have the right to establish surface facilities that are relevant for the exploration or exploitation of the concession (Article 8).
- Exploration concessions lasts for up to four years. Exploitation concessions have no time limit (Article 17).

== See also ==
- ad coelum principle
- History of mining in Chile
- Mining concession
