= Mantoverde mine =

Copper mine in Atacama, Chile

- Location within Atacama Region Location within Chile
- Location: Atacama Region, Chile; 26°33′15″S 70°19′00″W
- Products: Copper
- Company: Capstone Copper (70%); Mitsubishi Minerals (30%)

The Mantoverde mine is a large copper mine located in northern Chile in the Atacama Region. Mantoverde represents one of the largest copper reserves in Chile and in the world having estimated reserves of 580 million tonnes of ore grading 0.5% copper.

The mine hosted as of January 2025 four open-pits.

In July 2025 a mine expansion plan called Mantoverde Optimizado had its Environmental Impact Declaration approved by authorities allowing for the mine life to increase from 19 to 25 years and to increase its mineral processing capacity from 32,000 to 45,000 metric tons per day.

Together with Capstone Copper's mining project of Santo Domingo it is thought to be able to produce battery-grade cobalt.

A majority of the shares of the mine were bought by Capstone Mining in 2015 from Anglo American Chile, and it was inherited by Capstone Copper after the merge of Capstone Mining and Mantos Copper. In February 2020, Mitsubishi Materials Corp stated that it bought a stake worth 30% in the company for $236 million. At present 70% of the shares in the mine are held by Capstone Copper and the remaining 30% by Mitsubishi Minerals.

On January 2, 2026, 643 workers in the mine begun a strike citing a "lack of agreement" on a collective bargaining. On February 1 Capstone Copper announced a partial restart of operations in Mantoverde, but the labour strike remained.

== See also ==
- Copper mining in Chile
- List of copper mines
- List of mines in Chile
