= Antucoya =

- Location within Antofagasta Region Location within Chile

Location
- Location: Border between Maria Elena and Mejillones, Antofagasta Region, Chile; 22°38′2.35″S 69°52′35.34″W

Production
- Products: Copper
- Production: 77,800 tonnes copper cathode
- Financial year: 2023

History
- Opened: 2017

Owner
- Company: Antofagasta Minerals (70%); Marubeni Copper Holdings Limited (30%)
- Website: web.antucoya.cl/

Antucoya is an open pit copper mine located in the Atacama Desert of northern Chile. More precisely it lies straddling the borders of the communes of Maria Elena and Mejillones in Antofagasta Region. As of 2023 it employed on average 2,661 workers, including contractors. Among the workers 48.3% are from Antofagasta Region and 23% are female. It lies about 125 km northeast of the port city of Antofagasta. The ore mined in Antucoya consists of copper oxides which are processed using solvent extraction and electrowinning (SX-EW). The final prime product of the mine is copper cathode.

The mine holds The Copper Mark environmental certificate.

The ores belong to a porphyry copper system that intruded La Negra Formation and cooled in Early Cretaceous times.
