= Michilla =

Copper mine in Chile

- Location within Antofagasta Region Location within Chile
- Location: Mejillones, Antofagasta Region, Chile; 22°40′44.33″S 70°10′11.39″W
- Products: Copper
- Production: ▲19,900 kTon copper
- Financial year: 2024
- Opened: 1994
- Company: Haldeman Mining

The Michilla is an open pit copper mine located in the Atacama Desert of northern Chile. More precisely it lies near the Pacific in the commune of Mejillones in the Antofagasta Region. Mining of copper in the modern Michilla mine started in 1994 and peaked in 1996 with 63,000 metric tons of copper mined that year. The mine was operated by Antofagasta Minerals until December 2015 when its operations were put on hold. That year the mine produced 29,400 metric tons of copper or 5% of Antofagasta Minerals copper produce that year. As Michilla became gradually depleted in 2016 it was sold by Antofagasta Minerals to Haldeman Mining which was to develop it as a medium-scale mine. The years 2016 to 2018 no copper was mined at Michilla. Since the restart of mining in 2019 the amount of copper mined has tended to increase but have remained under the production levels of 2015. A new mining plan was approved in 2023 by authorities allowing for the mine to extend its planned lifetime to 2045.

The copper ores of Michilla are emplaced in Jurassic-aged volcanic rocks of La Negra Formation. The ores have been dated to haver formed 164 to 137 million years ago. The orebodies are associated to the traces of the north–south Atacama Fault System.

As a Mesozoic-aged stratabound copper deposit near the Coastal Cordillera the ores Michilla is similar to the deposits of Mantos Blancos, El Soldado and Lo Aguirre.
