= Centinela mine =

Copper and gold mine in Chile

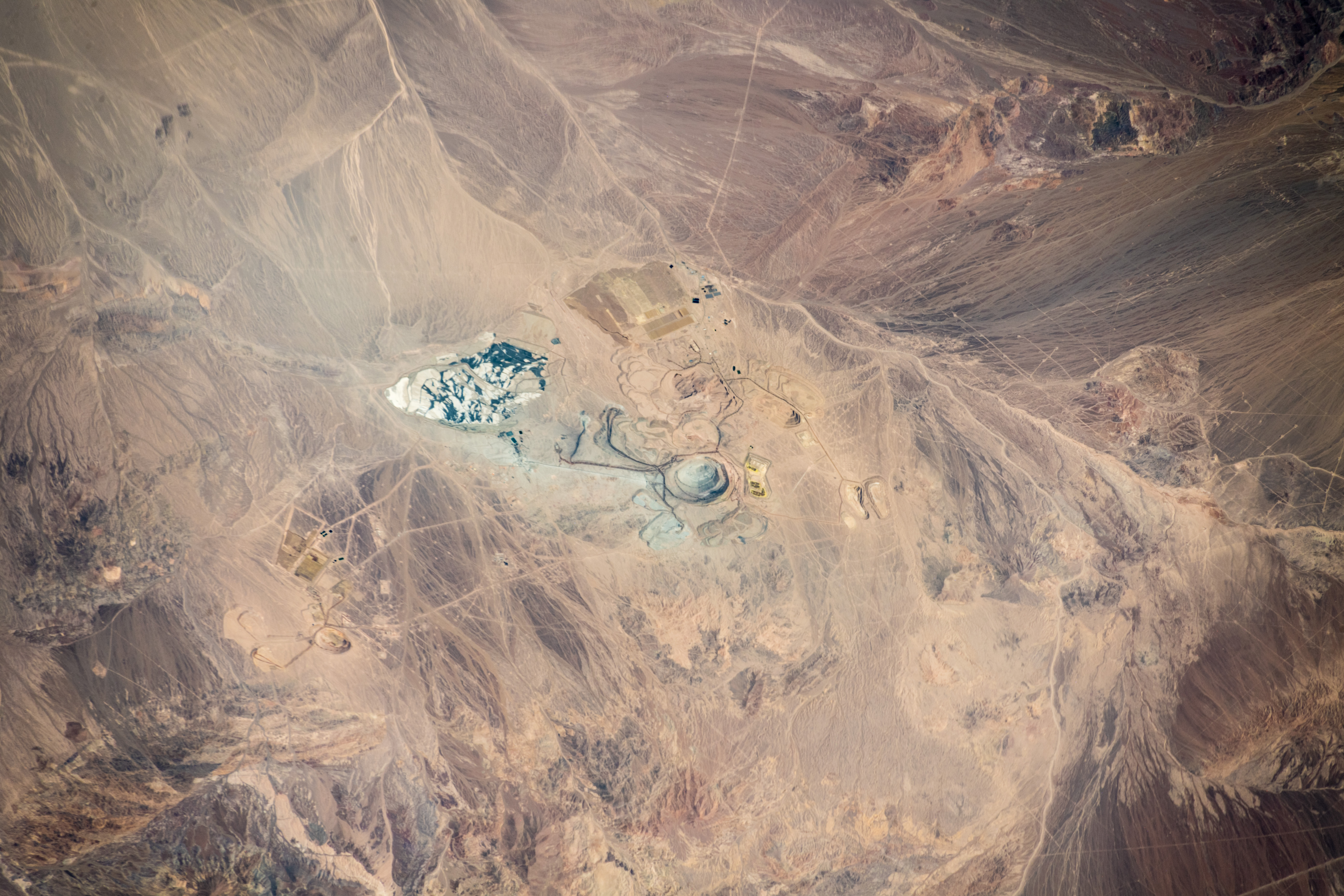
- Satellite imagery of Centinela mine from 2018.

- Location within Antofagasta Region Location within Chile

Location
- Location: Sierra Gorda, Antofagasta Region, Chile; 22°58′30.56″S 69°3′41.11″W

Production
- Products: Copper, gold, molybdenum
- Production: 162,700 tonnes copper concentrate 79,300 tons copper cathodes 900 tons of molybdenum 165,800 ounces gold
- Financial year: 2023

History
- Opened: 2014

Owner
- Company: Minera Centinela: Antofagasta Minerals (70%); Marubeni Copper Holdings Limited (30%)

The Centinela mine (Spanish: mina Centinela) is a large open pit copper and gold mine located in the Atacama Desert of northern Chile. More precisely it lies in the commune of Sierra Gorda in the Antofagasta Region. The mine to its current form and name in 2014 when Antofagasta Minerals merged the operations of the adjoining mines of Esperanza and El Tesoro.

As of 2023 Centinela mine employed on average 9,115 workers, including contractors. It relies exclusively on desalinized water for its operation and mineral processing. In 2023, with a gold production of 5,103 kg it ranked second on gold production in Chile after Escondida. The company operating the mine, Minera Centinela emerged from the fusion of Minera Esperanza and Minera El Tesoro, and is controlled by Antofagasta Minerals Minera Centinela holds the international certificates of; The Copper Mark, Moly Mark and ISO 9001:201.

Copper in the mine is found in copper sulfide and iron-copper sulfide minerals. The porphyry hosting copper and gold is mostly surrounded by andesite with some lesser volumes of dacite in the central part of the pit. Most faults that cross the mine area runns NE-SW and are deeply dipping to the southeast.

The mine's produce is largely exported as ore concentrate that contained as of 2020 an estimate of 34% chalcopyrite, 16% chalcocite, 35% pyrite and 1% pyrrhotite.

Construction of the mine begun in 2008 and it then started to produce in 2011. As of 2016 the mine had plans to remain operative until at least 2060. In August 2025 the mine begun to develop a new opeen pit known as Encuentro Sulfuros.
