= Collahuasi mine =

Copper mine in Chile

- Location within Chile

Location
- Location: Tarapacá Region, Chile; 20°59′29.19″S 68°38′19″W

Production
- Products: Copper; Molybdenum

Owner
- Company: Compañía Minera Doña Inés de Collahuasi: Anglo American plc (44%); Glencore (44%); Mitsui & Co. (12%)

The Collahuasi or Ujina mine is a large copper mine located at 4,200 m (13,800 ft) altitude in the north of Chile in the Tarapaca Region. Collahuasi represents one of the largest copper reserves in Chile and in the world having estimated reserves of 3.93 billion tonnes of ore grading 0.66% copper. It lies about 15 km east of the copper mine of Quebrada Blanca.

The mine produced 560,000 tonnes of copper in 2018, making it one of the world's largest copper mines.

The ore concentrate produced in Collahuasi mine contain about 41% chalcopyrite, 18% chalcocite, 16% pyrite and 4% pyrrhotite. (Note: When dry and as weight percent.)

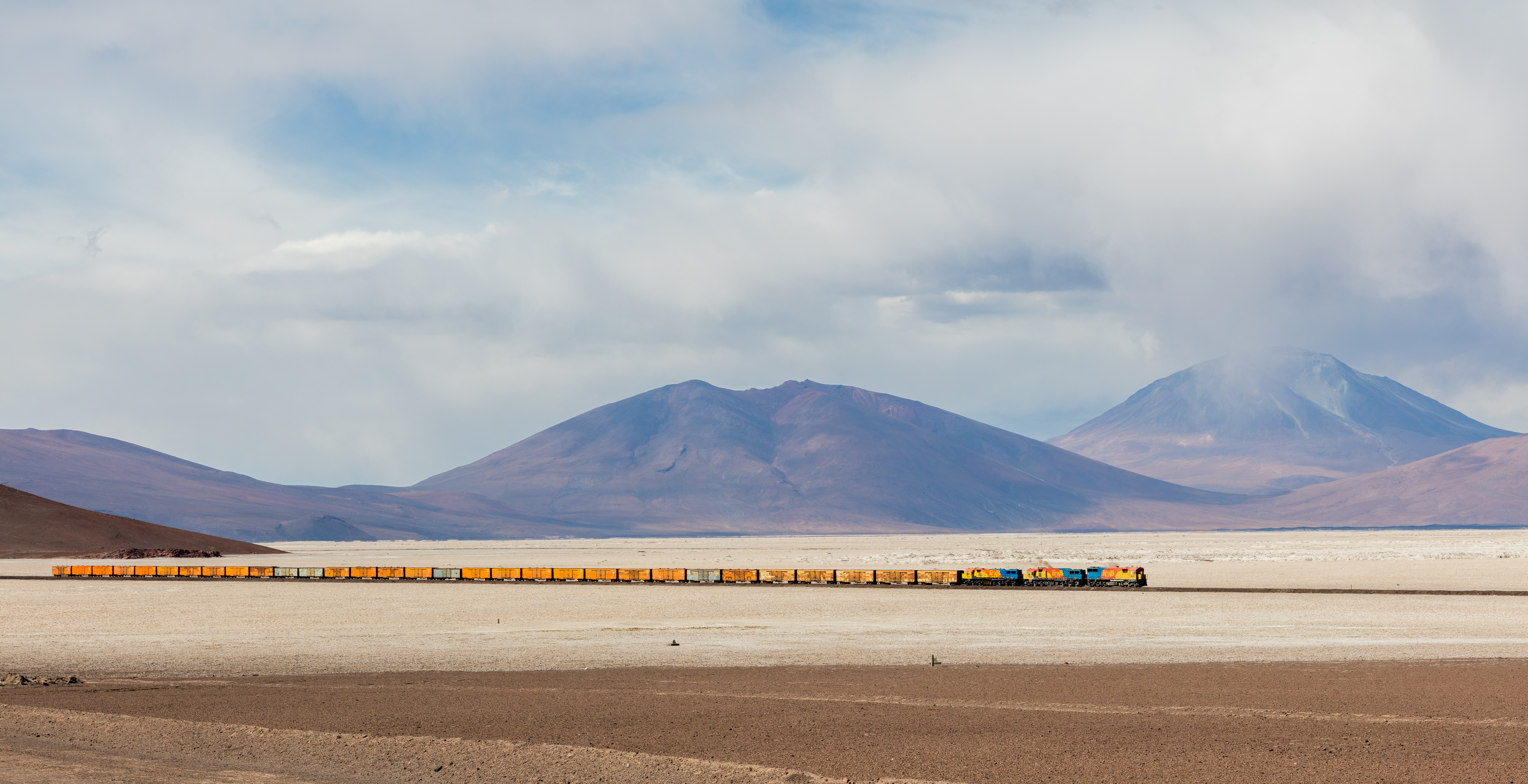
FCAB ore train crossing the Ascotán salt flat at the mine

An early period of mining in Collahuasi occurred from about 1905 until 1930.

== 2020s: Water scarcity and expansion project ==
In the 2020s the mine has faced difficulties relating to water scarcity and decreasing ore grades. In May 2026 the mine suffered a major legal reversal as the First Environmental Court of Antofagasta annulled a key permit (RCA) for a $3.2 billion expansion of the mine. The Environmental Assessment Service is set to reassess two items of the expansion project, the desalination plant and the "human environment" (Spanish: medio humano). The approval of other items remain intact. If approved as whole, the expansion project will delay for 20 years the planned mine closure.

== Climate ==
Climate data for Collahuasi, elevation 4,800 m (15,700 ft)
Month	Jan	Feb	Mar	Apr	May	Jun	Jul	Aug	Sep	Oct	Nov	Dec	Year
Mean daily maximum °C (°F)	12.2 (54.0)	8.3 (46.9)	9.3 (48.7)	9.3 (48.7)	5.9 (42.6)	1.9 (35.4)	3.0 (37.4)	3.9 (39.0)	4.0 (39.2)	7.7 (45.9)	9.6 (49.3)	10.3 (50.5)	7.1 (44.8)
Daily mean °C (°F)	3.5 (38.3)	1.7 (35.1)	1.3 (34.3)	0.6 (33.1)	−2.6 (27.3)	−5.9 (21.4)	−4.0 (24.8)	−3.3 (26.1)	−2.8 (27.0)	−0.9 (30.4)	0.0 (32.0)	2.5 (36.5)	−0.8 (30.5)
Mean daily minimum °C (°F)	−1.5 (29.3)	−1.4 (29.5)	−3.1 (26.4)	−4.4 (24.1)	−7.0 (19.4)	−10.4 (13.3)	−9.1 (15.6)	−8.3 (17.1)	−8.4 (16.9)	−6.3 (20.7)	−5.7 (21.7)	−2.7 (27.1)	−5.7 (21.8)
Average precipitation mm (inches)	5.5 (0.22)	5.1 (0.20)	2.5 (0.10)	0.0 (0.0)	0.0 (0.0)	4.5 (0.18)	0.0 (0.0)	0.0 (0.0)	10.0 (0.39)	2.5 (0.10)	0.0 (0.0)	5.0 (0.20)	35.1 (1.39)
Source: Bioclimatografia de Chile
