= Spence mine =

Copper mine in Antofagasta Region, Chile

- Location within Antofagasta Region Location within Chile
- Location: Sierra Gorda, Antofagasta Region, Chile; 22°47′39.9″S 69°15′11.88″W
- Products: Copper
- Production: ▲255,600 tonnes copper
- Financial year: 2024
- Discovered: 1996
- Opened: 2006
- Company: Pampa Norte (BHP)

The Spence mine is an open pit copper mine located in the Atacama Desert of northern Chile. More precisely it lies in the commune of Sierra Gorda in the Antofagasta Region. The mine begun operations in 2006, and prior to 2021 it had an annual copper produce under 200,000 tonnes. From 2021 onwards the mine has produced each year more than 200,000 tonnes of copper. In 2024 it produced 255,600 tonnes of copper making it Chile's 7th most productive copper mine. The mine is together with Cerro Colorado mine operated by the company Pampa Norte which is owned by BHP. It lies 162 km (101 mi) northeast of the port city of Antofagasta.

The ores of the mine site were discovered in 1996, during a period (1995–2004) in which many medium-sized mineral deposits of gold and copper with non-mineralized cover rocks were discovered in Chile.

The mine holds The Copper Mark environmental certificate.
