= El Abra mine =

- Location within Antofagasta Region Location within Chile
- Location: El Loa, Chile; 21°55′14″S 68°50′00″W
- Products: Copper; Molybdenum; Gold; Silver
- Production: 99,100 tonnes of copper
- Financial year: 2024
- Company: Sociedad Contractual Minera El Abra: Freeport-McMoRan (51%); Codelco (49%)

The El Abra mine is a large copper mine located in northern Chile in the El Loa province. It is operated by American mining company Freeport-McMoRan, who owns a 51% stake in the mine, with the remainder owned by the Chilean state-owned Codelco. It is legally constitued as a Sociedad Contractual Minera (SCM).

The mine's annual produce lies since 2016 in the range of 70 to 100 kMT copper fines. Previously, from 2005 to 2015 the annual produce was in the range of 120 to 220 kMT copper fines. El Abra was in 2025 Chile's 17th most productive copper mine.

As of 2026 the mine declares to run fully on renewable energy.

== Origin and ownership changes ==
The stake owned by Freeport-McMoRan originally owned by Cyprus Amax Minerals and Lac Minerals until Phelps Dodge acquired Cyprus Minerals and Lac minerals was absorbed by Barrick Gold in 1994. These two companies had won a bid to engage in a partnership with Codelco. It was then owned by Phelps Dodge until 2007 when Freeport-McMoRan completed a $25.9 billion acquisition of Phelps Dodge. The mine holds The Copper Mark environmental certificate.

The development of the previously unexploited El Abra ores as a joint venture was enabled by the law Ley N° 19.137 of 1992 which allowed Codelco to sell its assests with the previous approval by the Chilean Copper Commission and allowed the company to form joint ventures. In the bid process nine proposals were evaluated by Codelco which settled for the joint bid of Cyprus Minerals and Lac Minerals. The bid process suffered however from an overestimation of resources by 14% which caused the winning party, Cyprus Amax Minerals (renamed after a 1993 merger with AMAX Inc.) and Lac Minerals, to renegotiate the acquisition down to US$345 million from the previous price of US$405 million. Codelco reportedly did not contest the new proposed price as a matter of the precedent failed negotiations would create for future joint ventures.

== 2026 expansion plan ==
On March 2026, the company submitted to the Environmental Assessment Service the environmental impact assessment of an expansion plan to extend the mine’s lifetime for 40 years. If approved on schedule, new sectors of the mine would enter production in 2033. The expansion plan includes the growth of the open-pit, the establishment of a new mineral concentrator, a new tailings deposit and the construction of a new mineral concentrator and of a desalination plant at the coast.

The expanded mine will destroy the pre-Columbian archaeological mining site Complejo Minero San José del Abra dated to 950-1536 since it lies on the planned pit area. In addition, the planned expansion will impact fossil heritage in area.
