= Los Bronces mine =

Copper mine in Chile

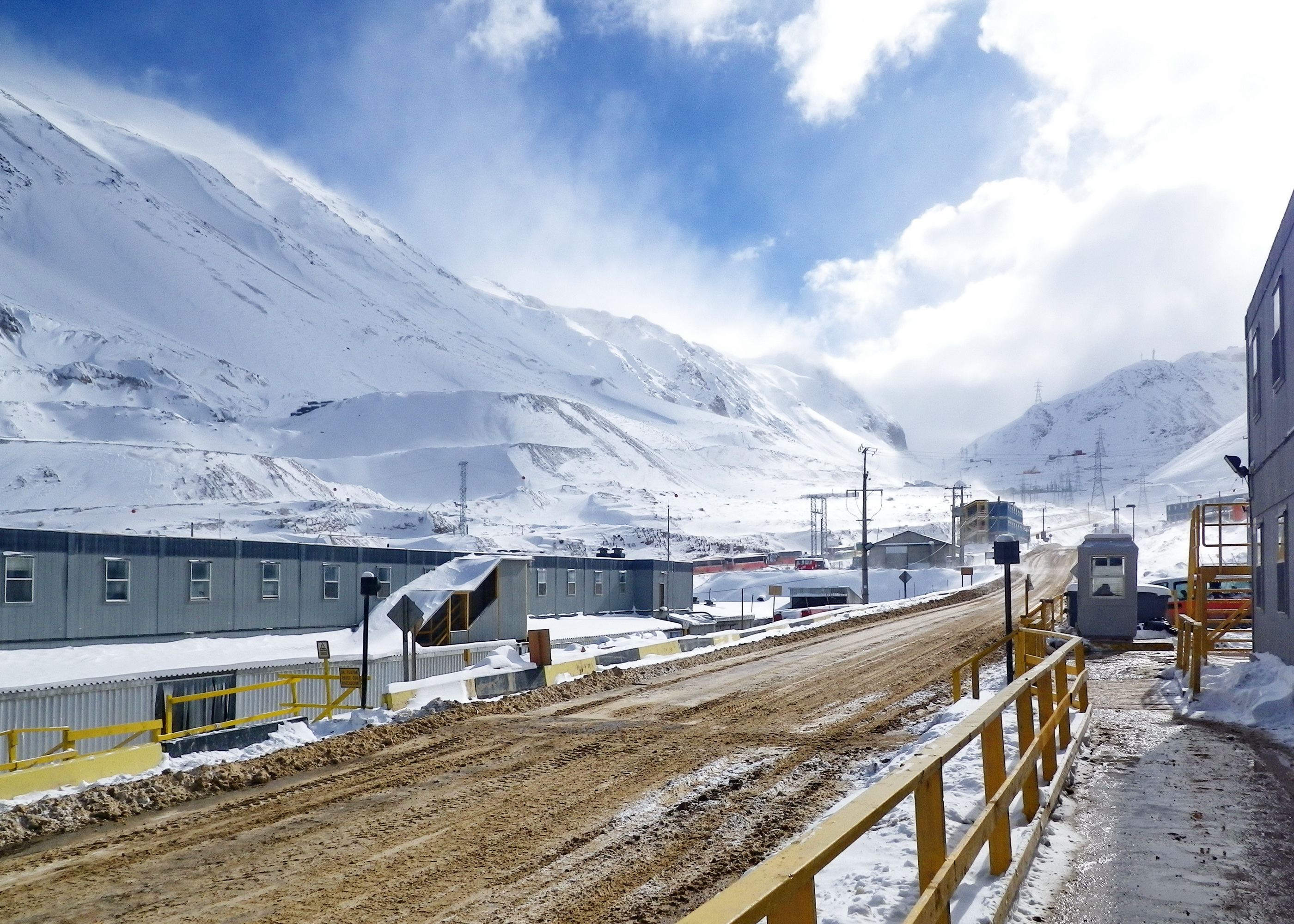
- Interactive map of Los Bronces mine
- Location: Santiago Metropolitan Region/Valparaíso Region, Chile; 33°08′42″S 70°16′16″W
- Products: Copper
- Production: ▼172,400 tonnes of copper
- Financial year: 2024
- Company: Anglo American Sur
- Acquired: 2002

The Los Bronces mine is a large copper mine located in central Chile, on the border of the Santiago Metropolitan Region and the Valparaíso Region. The processing plant is located at 3,300 m above sea level, with mining operations extending up to 4200 m above sea level. Los Bronces represents one of the largest copper reserves in Chile and in the world having estimated reserves of 3.13 billion tonnes of ore grading 0.32% copper.

The ore concentrate produced in the main contained as of 2020 about 4% chalcopyrite, 32% chalcocite and 45% pyrite.

Following the Chilean nationalization of copper in the early 1970s stateowned company ENAMI came to own the mine which was by then known as Disputada de Las Condes. In late 1977 ENAMI sold the mine to Exxon for 93 million US$. Exxon later sold the mine to Anglo American plc for 1300 million US$ in 2002.

In Los Bronces mining folklore tells of man known as "El Futre" (lit. "The Snob"). El Futre is said to be a formally dressed man who appear in drifts murdering or scaring workers in order to steal their salary.

The mine holds The Copper Mark environmental certificate. It lies in an area of rock glaciers.

== Geology ==
Mineralization at Los Bronces is thought to be due to its position at the intersection of two large fault systems. This favoured the rise of magma and the subsequent circulation of mineral-rich fluids.
