= Dulcinea mine =

Copper mine in Chile

Dulcinea
- Location within Atacama Region Location within Chile
- Location: Atacama Region, Chile; 27°09′10″S 69°57′52″W
- Products: Copper, gold
- Opened: 1854

Dulcinea is a copper and gold mine in northern Chile about 40–50 km north-east of the city of Copiapó and about 40 km south of the town of Inca de Oro. It is classified as a medium-size deposit by the National Geology and Mining Service. In 1966 it was the deepest mine in Chile with its deepest parts reaching then 1 km below surface. Dulcinea lies in an area of cold desert climate.

The ore of the mine is mainly composed of a vein of chalcopyrite, crysocolla, malachite, molybdenite and pyrite. The main vein is chiefly composed of chalcopyrite and has a thickness of 1.5 m and 8% of its mass made of copper. There are also lesser amounts of chalcocite and secondary djurleite. Gangue minerals found in the mine are; calcite, quartz, hematite and tourmaline. The mine also host small amounts of zinc in sphalerite and as native alloys. In parts the main vein is split into two separated by a sliver of altered diorite.

The mine was likely exploited already in Pre-Hispanic times but the modern mine dates to 1854. The mine was owned by The Copper Mines of Copiapo owned by British capital. In late 1970, during the Presidency of Salvador Allende, the mine was organized as worker's cooperative, being the first one of a series of cooperative mines that formed in the early 1970s.
