= Environmental Assessment Service =

Public agency that regulates issues related to the environment

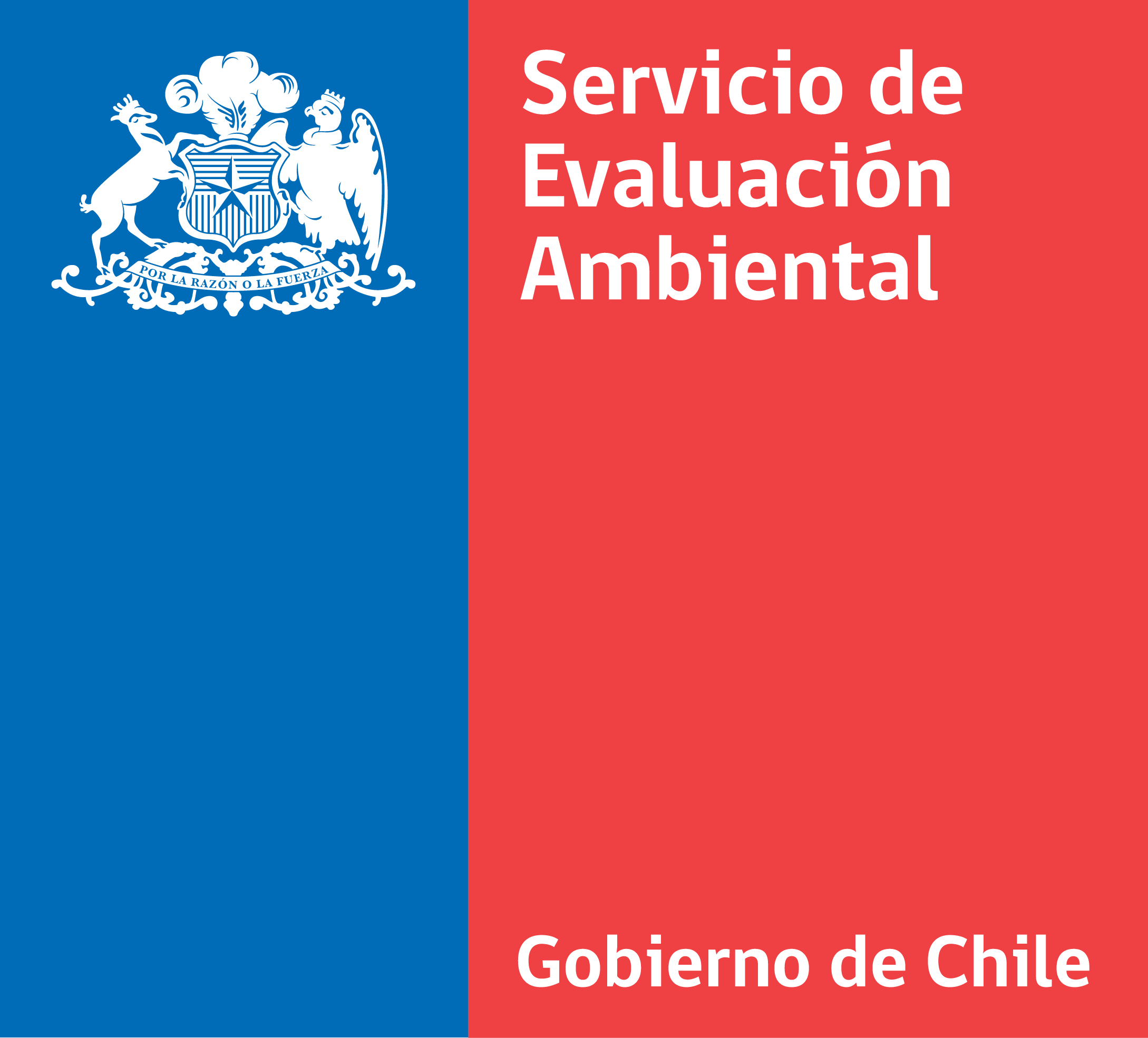
Logotype of the Environmental Assessment Service.

Chile's Environmental Assessment Service (Spanish: Servicio de Evaluación Ambiental or SEA) is a public agency that regulates issues related to the environment. With regards of natural resources it seeks that these are used in a rational, sustainable, responsible and ethical manner. Its predecessor agency is Comisión Nacional de Medio Ambiente (CONAMA). The origins of the agency can be traced to 2005 when OECD suggested a series of improvements to the environmental legislation of Chile. In 2018 442 persons were employed by the Environmental Assessment Service, including 25 geographers. As of September 2025, a total 452 projects worth US$108 billion were being reviewed by the service.

The Environmental Assessment Service has been criticized for the lengthiness of its processes, the uncertainty in them, and as lacking full independence as it depends ultimately on the authority of President of Chile.
