= Compañía Minera Huanchaca =

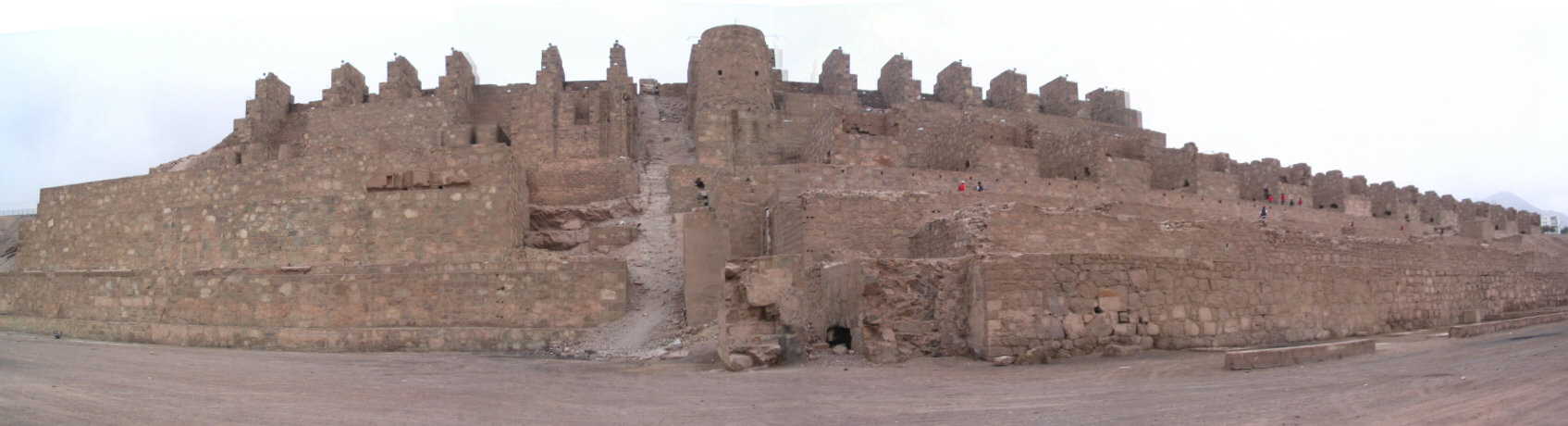
- Formerly: Sociedad Mineralógica de Huanchaca
- Industry: Silver
- Genre: Mining
- Founded: December 17, 1833 (precursor); 1873 (modern company)
- Founder: Mariano Ramírez (1833); Aniceto Arce (1873)
- Headquarters: Pulacayo, Bolivia

Compañía Minera Huanchaca or Compañía Huanchaca de Bolivia was a silver mining company with operations in Pulacayo and Huanchaca near Uyuni in southwestern Bolivia. It was a Bolivian company, originally founded in 1833 but restructured in 1873 to incorporate British and Chilean capital. Since the 1850s the company was controlled by Aniceto Arce who became Bolivia's richest person. Despite Chilean involvement the company survived the War of the Pacific (1879–1883) unscattered. It has been variously argued that the company was used as political tool by Arce who eventually became president of Bolivia from 1888 to 1892. In the late 19th century Compañía Minera Huanchaca was the main contributor to the Bovian state's coffers and it played a major role in the construction of the Ferrocarril de Antofagasta a Bolivia which connects Bolivia to the Pacific coast.

The company brought modern industrial proceeses to Bolivia aided by British engineers and machinery but relied also on traditional methods such as pallaqueo. Its establishment and growth is considered to have greatly disrupted indigenous society in southwestern Bolivia. At its height in the late 19th century it controlled the first or second most productive silver mining district in the world.

== History ==
Its precursor was established in 1833 by Bolivian miner Mariano Ramírez when he having worked with indigenous workers in the mines of Cosuño was told of the existence of silver in Pulacayo. Hence, Ramírez moved in to exploit the silver ore veins of Pulacayo as a rediscovery of a deposit that had been mined before. The company of Ramírez was transformed in 1856 with Mariano Argandoña's acquisition of the company. Argandoña brought Aniceto Arce to invest in the company and Arce bough soon out smaller shareholders taking control of the company. From 1873 the company received also much British and Chilean capital. Arce managed to have the Chilean notables of Melchor Concha y Toro, Gregorio Donoso, Elías Balmaceda, Aníbal Pinto Garmendia and Rafael Sotomayor invest in the company. Since Chilean capital never made up more than 1/5 of the shares it has been argued that Arce invited Chileans as way to establishing political alliances. The company made Arce Bolivia's riches man but caused him trouble during the War of the Pacific when he was accused of treason and temporarily exiled. Also for the duration of the war export of silver was rerouted to the port of Rosario in Argentina leading to longer transport distances and diminished returns.

For Bolivia, taxation of the company was a major source of state revenue in the late 19th century when foreign observers assessed Pulacayo was the main silver mine of the world or as comparable only to Broken Hill in Australia.

From 1888 to 1892 the company built in association with Compañía de Salitres y Ferrocarril de Antofagasta the silver smelter of Huanchaca in the Pacific port city of Antofagasta which had been under Chilean control since 1879. In 1902 this smelter ceased operations due to the instability of silver prices in the international market and the use of outdated smelter technology.

The mining in Pulacayo was done using modern technology but depended in part on the manual selection (pallaqueo) of ore fragments given the high ore grades required.
