= Illegal mining in Chile =

Illegal mining is a concern in Chile. As of 2025 it was considered to be on the rise but still far below the levels of neighbouring countries like Brazil, Colombia, Ecuador and Peru. In 2024 there were 20 formal complaints of illegal mining before the National Geology and Mining Service. There is as of 2025 no large-scale illegal mining in Chile and most illegal mining is deemed equivalent to small-scale theft from prospects or closed mines. Illegal mining in Chile lacks so far the typical structures of organized crime.

The fact that most small-scale mining in Chile focus on copper, which means handling large volumes difficult to smuggle or hide has been thought to be a contributing factor to the low levels of illegal mining. Thus, rise of gold prices has been linked to rises in both legal and illegal gold mining in Chile. State-owned company Empresa Nacional de Minería has also a role in disincentivise illegal mining among small-scale miners by providing them with; free legal advice, technical and financial assistance in addition to purchasing their ore.

The term chucullero is sometimes used pejoratively for artisan miners known as pirquineros who carry out illegal mining, but this is not always the case as chucullero also refers more generally to any pirquinero specialized in precious metals, mostly gold.

Some communes where illegal mining have been reported in the 2020s are: Hijuelas in Valparaíso Region, Illapel and Ovalle in Coquimbo Region and Copiapó and Huasco in Atacama Region. The placer deposits of some areas of difficult access in Patagonia are also subject to sporadic small-scale illegal gold mining.

Llanos de Challe National Park had an incident of small-scale illegal mining in 2021.

Illegal mining is greatly overrepresented relative to legal mining in deadly accidents in Chile.

List of lethal accidents in illegal mining in Chile since 2010
Date	Deaths	Mine/mining district	Cause of death	Commune	Reference
February 28, 2025	3	Jesús María mine	Rockfall	Copiapó	
December 18, 2024	2	La Fe	Carbon monoxide poisoning	Hijuelas	
September 4, 2020	1	Cavilolen	Rockfall	Illapel	
January 10, 2011	2	El Indio mine/El Indio Gold Belt	Rockfall	Vicuña	

== See also ==
- Environmental issues in Chile
- Gold mining in Chile
- Pallaqueo
- Sociedad Contractual Minera
