= List of stock used by Ferrocarril de Antofagasta a Bolivia =

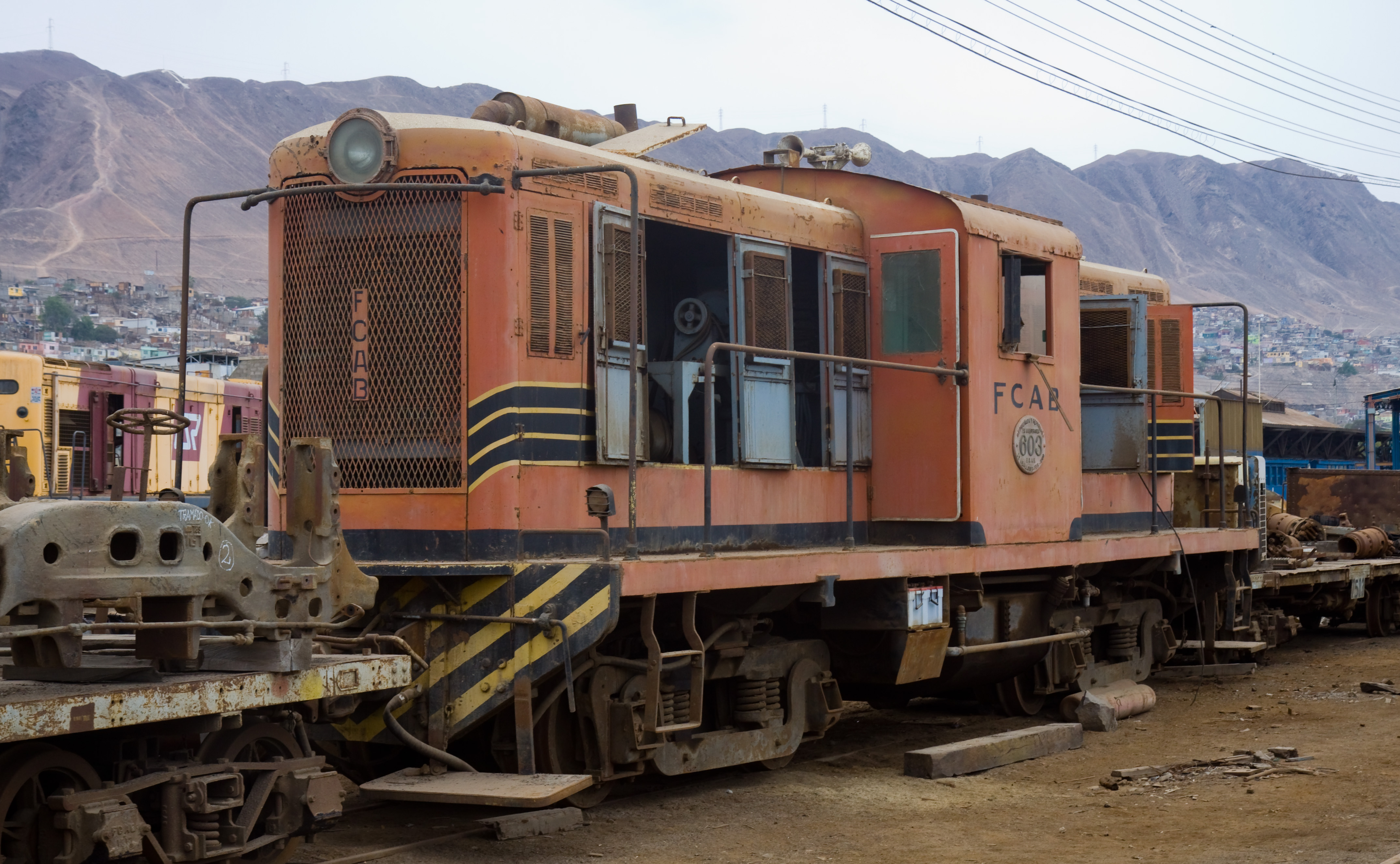
Retired Davenport 44 ton diesel at Antofagasta in April 2012

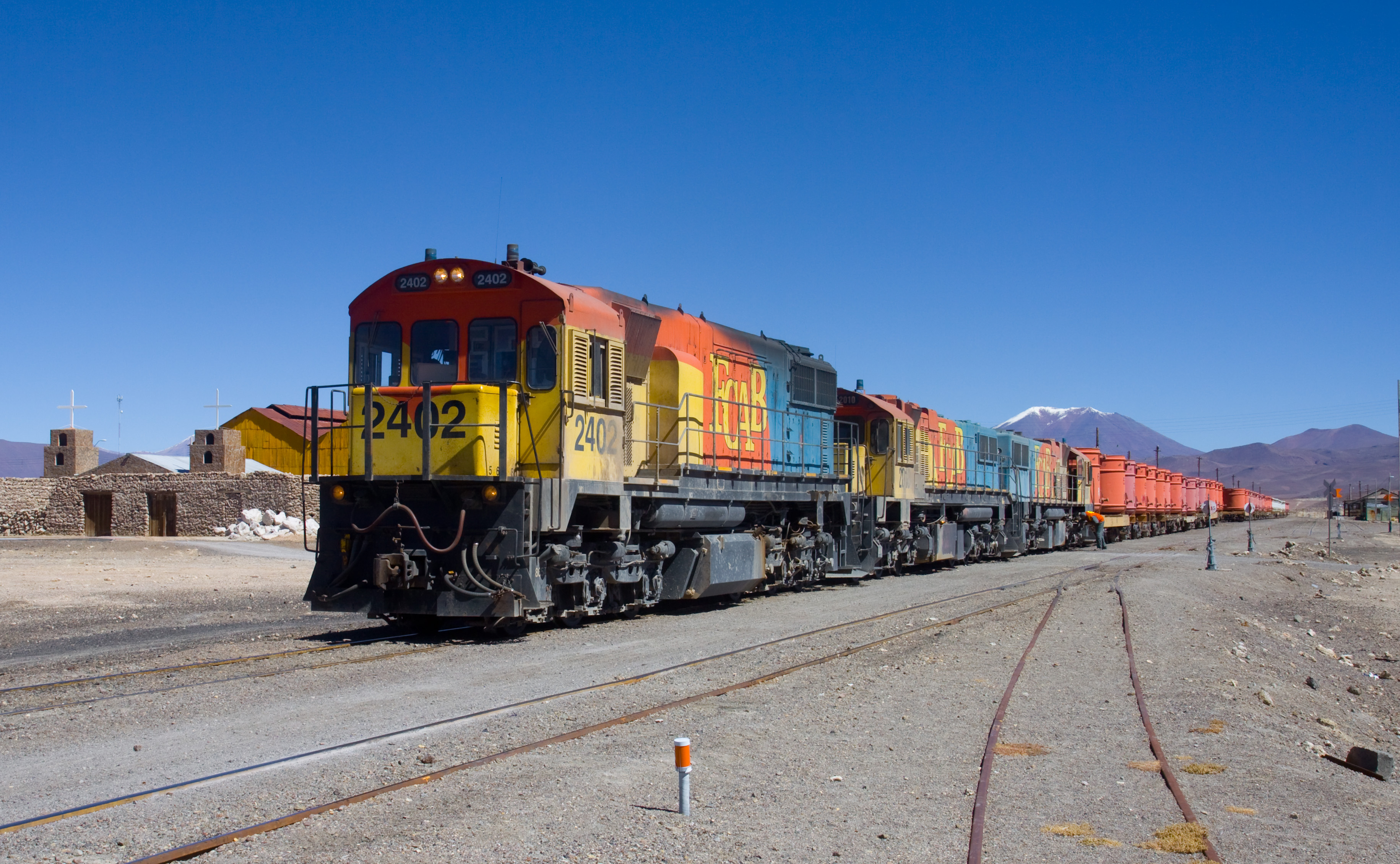
EMD GR12 2402 leads former Queensland Railways 2100 class 2010 & 2005 at Ollagüe in April 2012

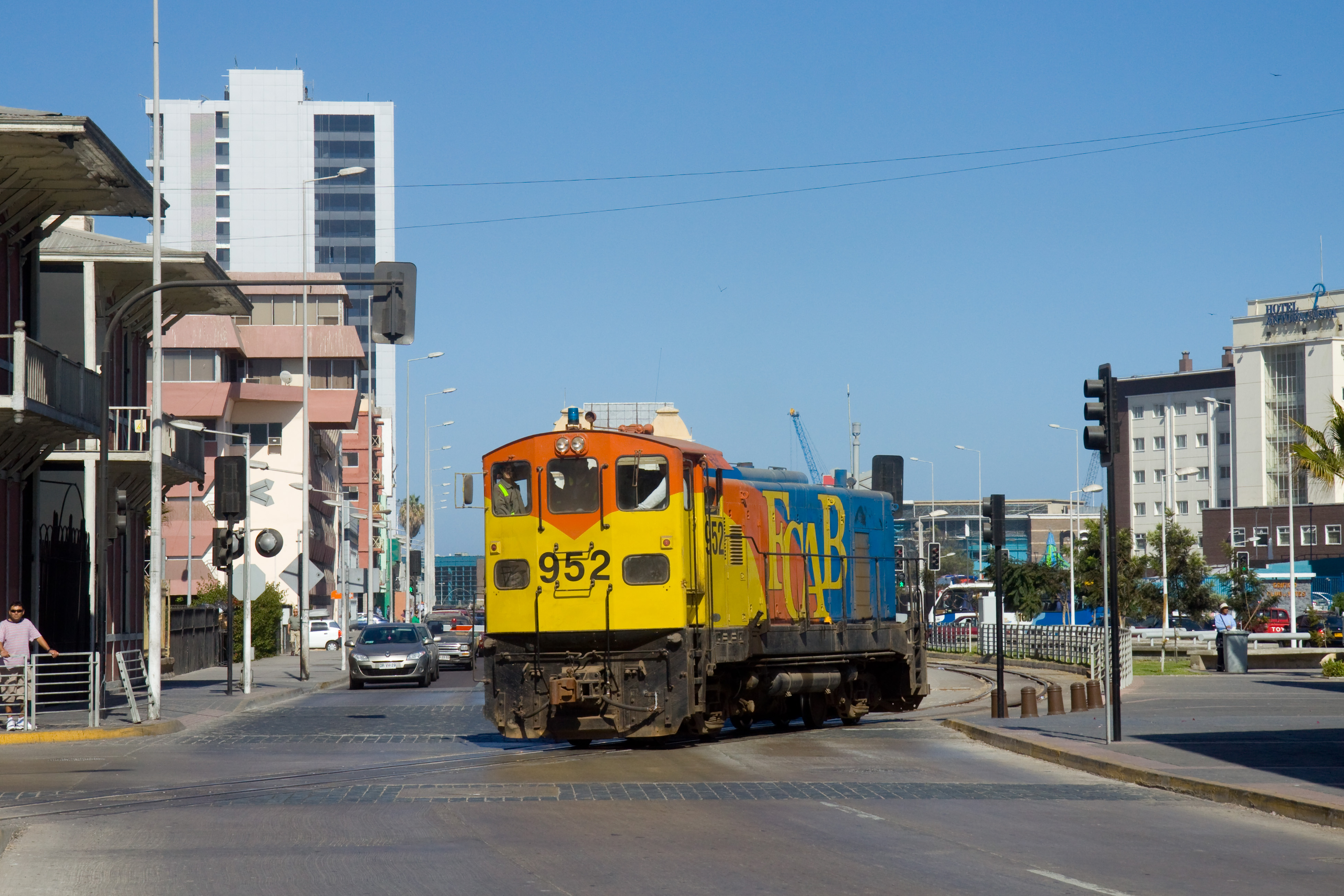
EMD GA8 shunter returning empty from the port of Antofagasta in April 2012

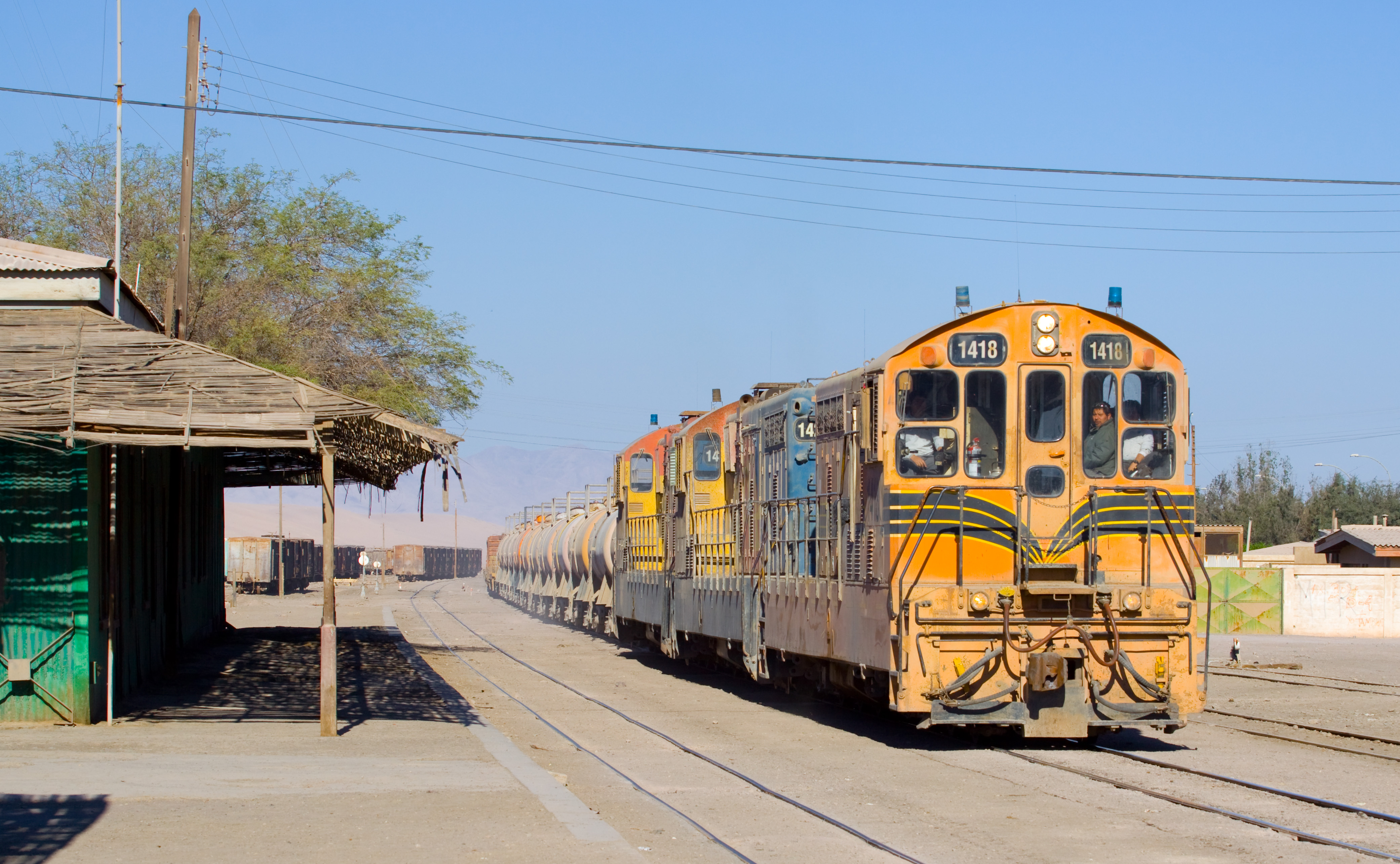
Three former Newfoundland Railway NF210 (EMD GR12UM) are passing Baquedano station in April 2012, the lead unit still carries the old FCAB livery

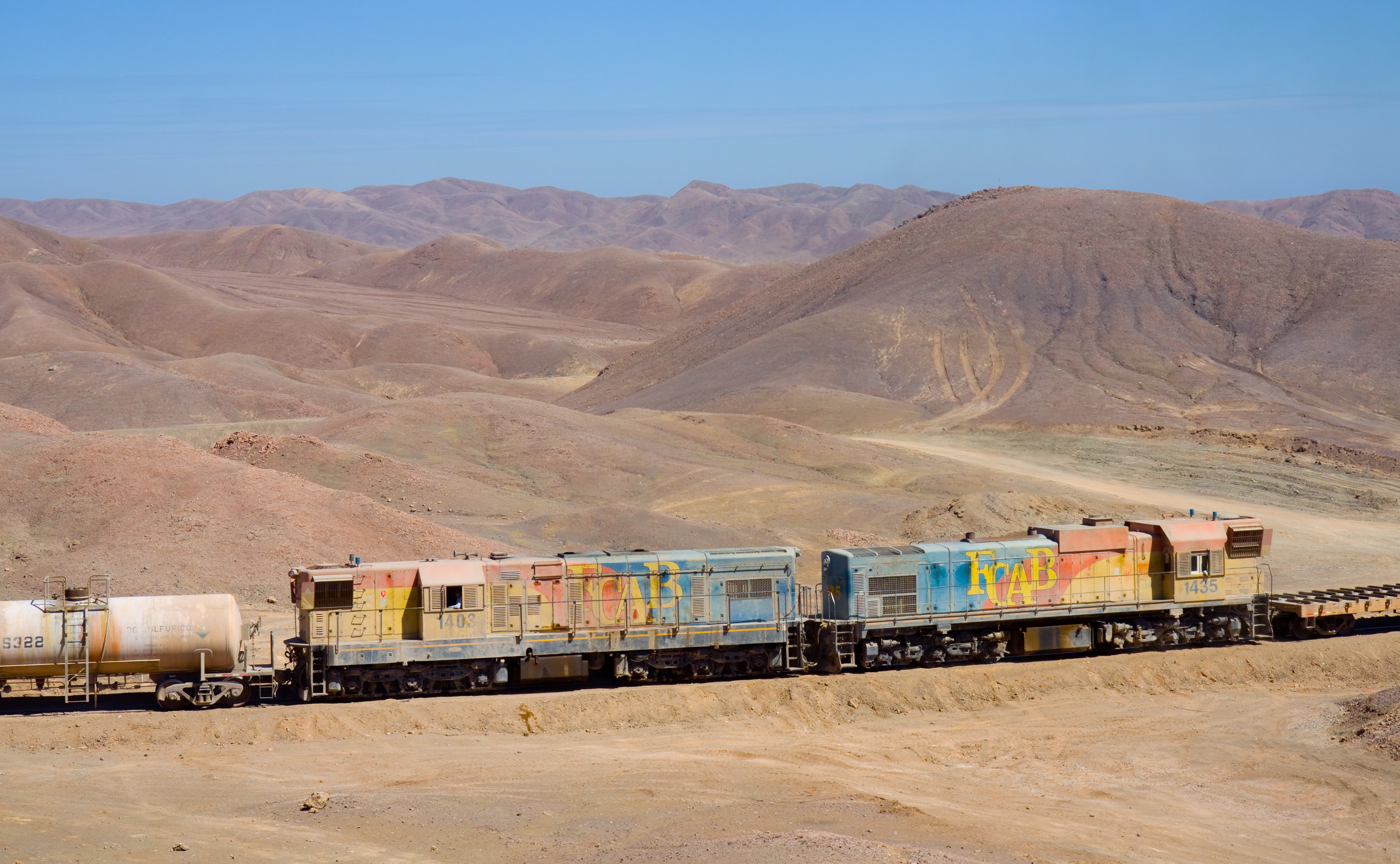
Mid-helpers EMD GR12U 1403 and former Westrail AA class 1435 working on Cumbre pass in April 2012

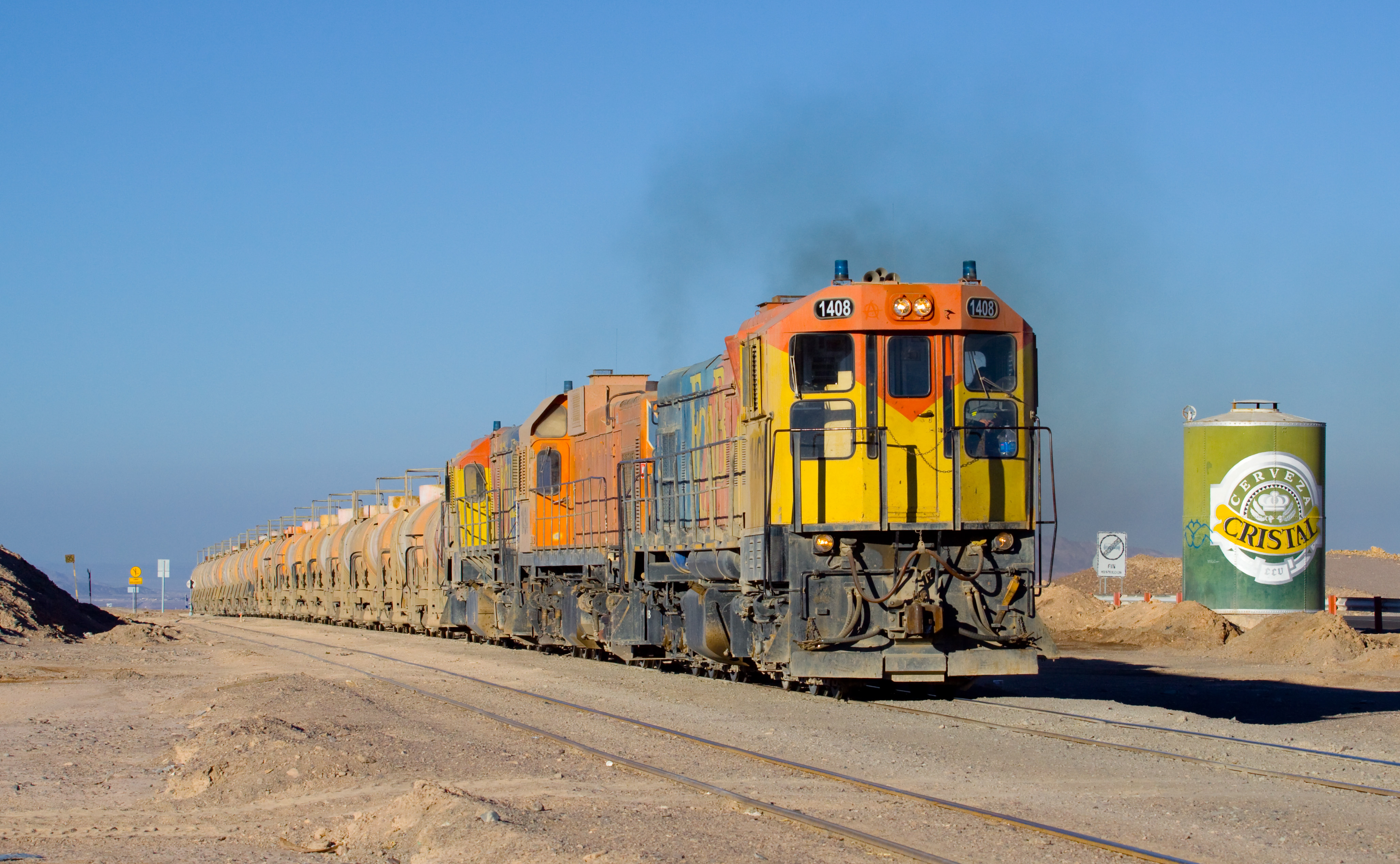
EMD GR12UDs 1408 & 1402 sandwich former Westrail A class 1434 passing a can of beer in the Atacama Desert in April 2012

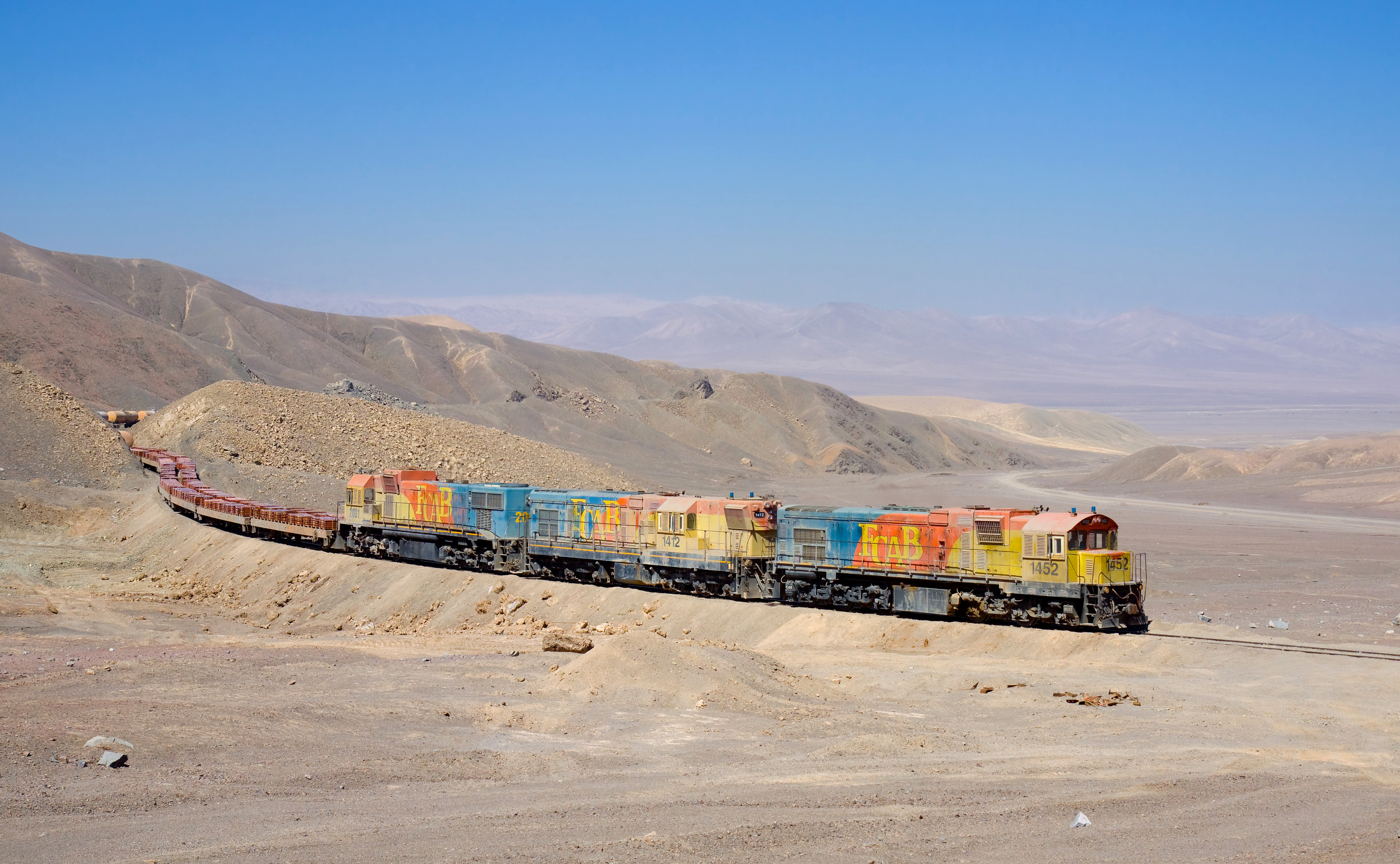
Former Queensland Railways 1502 class 1452 climbing Cumbre pass from Prat, together with GR12U 1412 and G26C-2 2001 in April 2012

This article gives an incomplete list of locomotives used by the 1,000 mm (3 ft 3 3/8 in) metre gauge Ferrocarril de Antofagasta a Bolivia (FCAB).

FCAB has bought only few new diesel locomotives. Instead, starting in 1978, they have bought a wide range of second hand engines (some in scrap condition) from various railway companies in South America, Newfoundland and Australia. Most locomotives are EMD types, with the exception of one Alco engine (1201) and two Davenport shunters. The Australian units were built by EMD licensee, Clyde Engineering. Thus, for most practical purposes, these are EMD locomotives.

FCAB no	Type	Factory no	Year built	Bought by FCAB	Comments
600	Davenport 44 ton	3046	1948	1958	Former ARPR^{1} no. 601. Retired after wreck, date unknown
601	Davenport 44 ton	3050	1948	1958	Former ARPR^{1} no. 605.Scrapped 1981
602	Davenport 44 ton	3051	1948	1958	Former ARPR^{1} no. 606. Rebuilt with 460/500 hp Cummins engine 1980
603	Davenport 44 ton	3052	1948	1958	Former ARPR no. 607. Rebuilt with 460/500 hp Cummins engine 1980
950	EMD GA8	28546	1964		
951	EMD GA8	28547	1964		
952	EMD GA8	28548	1964		
953	EMD GA18	34177	1969		
954	EMD G18U6	758010-1	1976		
1201	Alco DL 535	84023	1961	2004	Former EFE^{2} Dt 12118 resp. AFCALP^{3} Dt 12118
1400	EMD GR12U	26607	1961		
1401	EMD GR12U	26608	1961		
1402	EMD GR12U	26609	1961		
1403	EMD GR12U	26610	1961		
1404	EMD GR12U	26611	1961		
1405	EMD GR12U	26612	1961		
1406	EMD GR12UD	28549	1964		
1407	EMD GR12UD	28550	1964		
1408	EMD GR12UD	28551	1964		
1409	EMD GR12UD	28552	1964		
1410	EMD G22CU	34118	1969		
[1411]	EMD G22CU	37423	1971		Was never on FCAB property. Diverted to Codelco as their number 94
1411	EMD GR12U	26905	1961	1978	Former EFE Dt 13014
1412	EMD GR12U	26908	1961	1978	Former EFE Dt 13017
1413	EMD GR12UM (NF210)	A914	1956	1988	Former Canadian National Railway 926 prior to 1949 Newfoundland Railway
1414	EMD GR12UM (NF210)	A1451	1958	1988	Former Canadian National Railway 936 prior to 1949 Newfoundland Railway
1415	EMD GR12UM (NF210)	A899	1956	1988	Former Canadian National Railway 911 prior to 1949 Newfoundland Railway
1416	EMD GR12UM (NF210)	A898	1956	1988	Former Canadian National Railway 910 prior to 1949 Newfoundland Railway
1417	EMD GR12UM (NF210)	A917	1956	1988	Former Canadian National Railway 929
1418	EMD GR12UM (NF210)	A1841	1960	1988	Former Canadian National Railway 945 prior to 1949 Newfoundland Railway
1419	EMD GR12UM (NF210)	A909	1956	1988	Former Canadian National Railway 921 prior to 1949 Newfoundland Railway
1420	EMD GR12UM (NF210)	A903	1956	1988	Former Canadian National Railway 915
1421	EMD GR12UM (NF210)	A904	1956	1988	Former Canadian National Railway 916 prior to 1949 Newfoundland Railway
1422	EMD GR12UM (NF210)	A1840	1960	1988	Former Canadian National Railway 944 prior to 1949 Newfoundland Railway
1423	EMD GR12UM (NF210)	A1452	1958	1989	Former Canadian National Railway 937, prior to 1949 Newfoundland Railway former SQM^{4} (exchanged for CN 933)
1424	EMD GR12UM (NF210)	A1834	1960	1994	Former Canadian National Railway 938, former FCP^{5} 903
1425	EMD GR12UM (NF210)	A1837	1960	1994	Former Canadian National Railway 941, former FCP 905
1426	EMD GR12UM (NF210)	A1842	1960	1994	Former Canadian National Railway 946, former FCP 907
1427	EMD GR12UM (NF210)	A1835	1960	1994	Former Canadian National Railway 939, former FCP 904
1428	EMD GR12UM (NF210)	A1838	1960	1994	Former Canadian National Railway 942, former FCP 906
1429	EMD GR12UM (NF210)	A916	1956	1994	Former Canadian National Railway 928, former FCP 902
1430	EMD GR12UM (NF210)	A906	1956	1989	Former Canadian National Railway 918 prior to 1949 Newfoundland Railway
1431	Clyde Engineering G12CU	65-376	1965	1998	Former Westrail A1512
1432	Clyde Engineering G22CU	67-534	1967	1998	Former Westrail AA1515
1433	Clyde Engineering G22CU	67-535	1967	1998	Former Westrail AA1516
1434	Clyde Engineering G22CU	67-536	1967	1998	Former Westrail AA1517
1435	Clyde Engineering G22CU	67-537	1967	1998	Former Westrail AA1518
1436	Clyde Engineering G22CU	67-538	1967	1998	Former Westrail AA1519
1437	Clyde Engineering G22CU	69-677	1969	1998	Former Westrail AB1532
1438	EMD GR12	27963	1963	2001	Former FNC^{6} 402, former STF^{7} 1202
1439	EMD GR12	27968	1963	2005	Former FNC 407
1440	EMD GR12	27972	1963	2005	Former FNC 411
1441	EMD GR12	27975	1963	2005	Former FNC 414
1442	EMD GR12	27964	1963	2005	Former FNC 403
1443	Clyde Engineering G22CU	60-217	1960	2010	Former Westrail A1502
1444	Clyde Engineering G22CU	65-374	1965	2010	Former Westrail A1510
1445	EMD GR12UM (NF210)	A902	1956	2016	ex SIT Maria Elena 914 and originally CN 914
1446	EMD GR12UM (NF210)	A910	1956	2016	ex SIT Maria Elena 901 ex FCP Nicaragua 901 and originally CN 922
1447	EMD GR12UM (NF210)	A921	1956	2016	ex SIT Maria Elena 933 and originally CN 933
numbers 1448 to 1451 not used, intended for ex Columbian GR12 which were instead rebuilt to 2400 series
1452	Clyde Engineering GL22C	67-601	1967	2005	Former Queensland Rail 1506
1453	Clyde Engineering GL22C	69-649	1969	2005	Former Queensland Rail 1525
1454	Clyde Engineering GL22C	68-612	1968	2005	Former Queensland Rail 1517
1455	Clyde Engineering GL22C	68-647	1968	2005	Former Queensland Rail 1523
1456	Clyde Engineering GL22C	68-607	1968	2005	Former Queensland Rail 1512
1457	Clyde Engineering GL22C	68-618	1968	2005	Former Queensland Rail 1519
1458	Clyde Engineering GL22C	69-654	1968	2005	Former Queensland Rail 1530
2001	Clyde Engineering G26C-2	70-725	1971	1998	Former Westrail D1563
2002	Clyde Engineering GL26C-2	70-714	1971	2001	Former Queensland Rail 2103
2003	Clyde Engineering GL26C-2	70-715	1971	2001	Former Queensland Rail 2104
2004	Clyde Engineering GL26C-2	71-717	1971	2001	Former Queensland Rail 2106
2005	Clyde Engineering GL26C-2	71-718	1971	2001	Former Queensland Rail 2107
2006	Clyde Engineering GL26C-2	71-719	1971	2001	Former Queensland Rail 2108
2007	Clyde Engineering GL26C-2	72-740	1972	2001	Former Queensland Rail 2112
2008	Clyde Engineering GL26C-2	72-741	1972	2001	Former Queensland Rail 2113
2009	Clyde Engineering GL26C-2	72-742	1972	2001	Former Queensland Rail 2114
2010	Clyde Engineering GL26C-2	72-746	1972	2001	Former Queensland Rail 2118
2011	Clyde Engineering GL26C-2	72-747	1972	2001	Former Queensland Rail 2119
2401	EMD GT22CU-3 (rebuilt GR12)	27969	1963	2005	Former FNC 408
2402	EMD GT22CU-3 (rebuilt GR12)	27971	1963	2005	Former FNC 410, former STF 1210
2403	EMD GT22CU-3 (rebuilt GR12)	27966	1963	2005	Former FNC 405, former STF 1205
2404	EMD GT22CU-3 (rebuilt GR12)	29151	1964	2005	Former FNC 422, former STF 1222
2405	EMD GT22CU-3 (rebuilt GR12)	27974	1963	2005	Former FNC 413
2406	EMD GT22CU-3 (rebuilt GR12)	27973	1963	2005	Former FNC 412
2407	EMD GT22CU-3 (rebuilt GR12)	29150	1964	2005	Former FNC 421
[2408]	EMD GT22CU-3 (rebuilt GR12)	29154	1964	----	Former FNC 425; rebuilding never completed and parts used to repair damaged 2401 in 2013
2501	EMD GT22CU	believed to have been built on frame of retired GP40	?	2013	Former Tren a las Nubes/Belgrano Cargas TT01
2601	GE C23EMP	190649	2018	2018	Built by GE Brazil
2602	GE C23EMP	196050	2018	2018	Built by GE Brazil
2603	GE C23EMP	190651	2018	2018	Built by GE Brazil
2604	GE C23EMP	190652	2018	2018	Built by GE Brazil
2605	GE C23EMP	190653	2018	2018	Built by GE Brazil
3201	Progress Rail GT42AC	20168300-1	2018	2018	
3202	Progress Rail GT42AC	20168300-2	2018	2018	
3203	Progress Rail GT42AC	20168300-3	2018	2018	
3204	Progress Rail GT42AC	20168300-4	2018	2018	
3205	Progress Rail GT42AC	20168300-5	2018	2018	
3206	Progress Rail GT42AC	20168300-6	2018	2018	
3207	Progress Rail GT42AC	20168300-7	2018	2018	
3208	Progress Rail GT42AC	20188704-1	2019	2019	
3209	Progress Rail GT42AC	20188704-2	2019	2019	
3210	Progress Rail GT42AC	20188704-3	2019	2019	
3211	Progress Rail GT42AC	20188704-4	2019	2019	
3212	Progress Rail GT42AC	20188704-5	2019	2019	
3213	Progress Rail GT42AC	20188704-6	2019	2019	
3214	Progress Rail GT42AC	20188704-7	2019	2019	

== Notes ==
^{1}	ARPR	American Railroad of Puerto Rico
^{2}	EFE	Empresa de los Ferrocarriles del Estado
^{3}	AFCALP	Sociedad Administradora del Ferrocarril de Arica a La Paz
^{4}	SQM	Sociedad Química y Minera
^{5}	FCP	Ferrocarril del Pacífico
^{6}	FNC	Ferrocarriles Nacionales de Colombia
^{7}	STF	Sociedad de Transportes Ferroviarios
^{8}	CNR	The locomotives acquired in 1988 and 1989 from CNR were locomotives which became surplus when CNR abandoned the former 3 ft 6 in (1,067 mm) NR.

== See also ==
- Electro-Motive Diesel
- List of GM-EMD locomotives
