= WAGR A class (diesel) =

Class of Australian diesel locomotives

WAGR A/AA/AB Classes
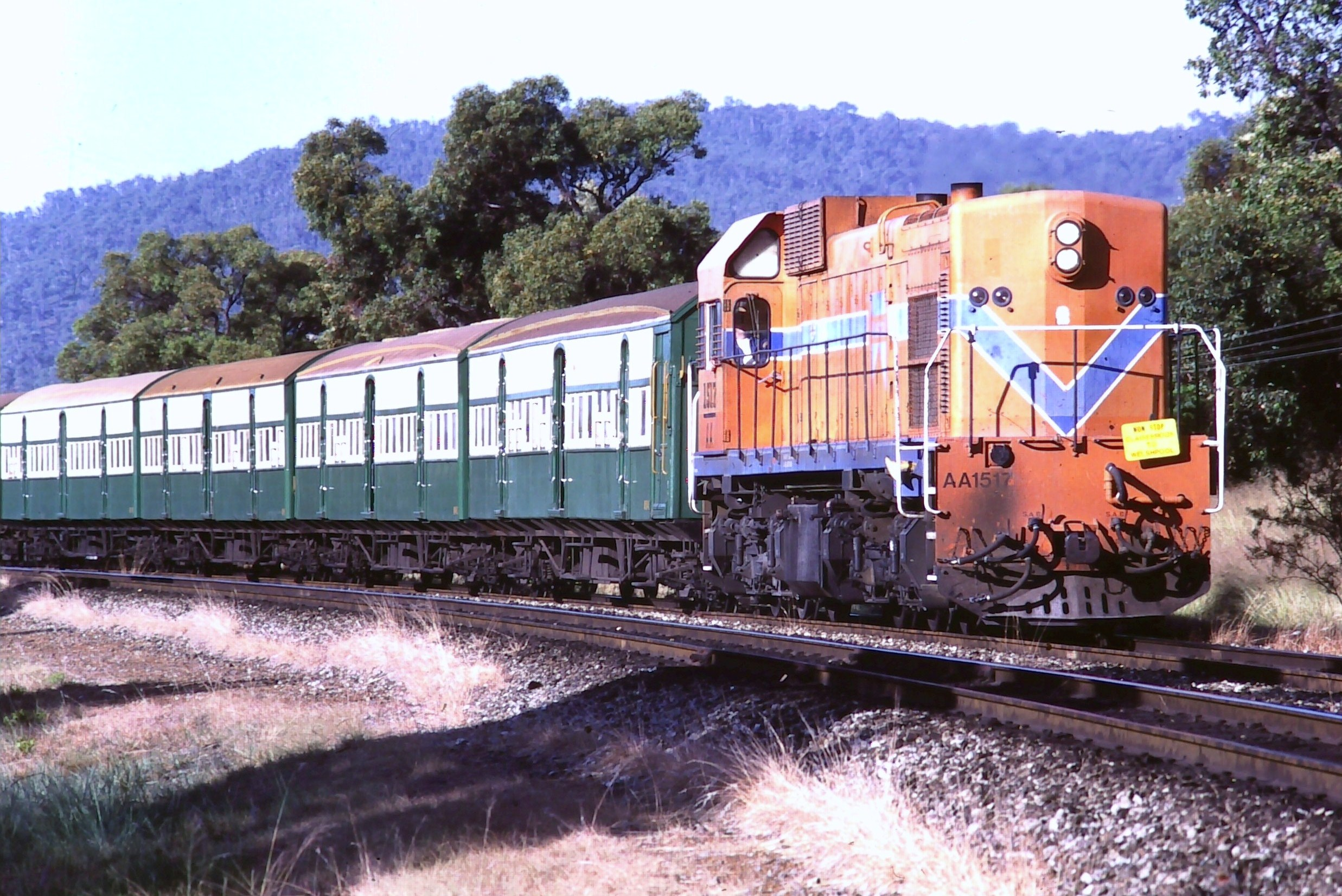
- AA1517 near Kelmscott in December 1986
Type and origin
- Power type: Diesel-electric
- Builder: Clyde Engineering, Granville; Comeng, Bassendean
- Model: Electro Motive Diesel G12CU (A1501-14), G22CU (AA, AB)
- Build date: 1960-1970
- Total produced: A: 14; AA: 5 AB: 6
Specifications
- Configuration
  - UIC: Co-Co
- Gauge: 1,067 mm (3 ft 6 in); 1,000 mm (3 ft 3 3/8 in)
- Wheel diameter: 1,016 mm (40.0 in)
- Length: A/AA: 16.16m (53'); AB: 16.358 m (53 ft 8.0 in)
- Axle load: A: 15t AA: 16t AB: 16.4t
- Loco weight: A: 89.16t AA: 96t AB: 97.35t
- Fuel type: Diesel
- Prime mover: A: Electro Motive Diesel 12-567C; AA/AB: Electro Motive Diesel 12-645E
- RPM range: A: 275-835; AA/AB: 307-900
- Generator: A1501-2: EMD D15E; A1503-14: EMD D25; AA: EMD D25; AB: EMD D32
- Traction motors: EMD D29
- Cylinders: 12
Performance figures
- Maximum speed: 100 km/h (62 mph)
- Power output: A: 1,200hp AA/AB: 1,500hp
- Tractive effort: 240kN (53,954lbf)
Career
- Operators: Aurizon; Ferrocarril de Antofagasta a Bolivia; Rail Heritage WA; Rusal
- Number in class: 25
- Numbers: A1501-A1514; AA1515-AA1519; AB1531-AB1536
- Locale: Western Australia, South Australia, Chile, South Africa, Guinea
- Delivered: June 1960
- First run: July 1960
- Preserved: A1501, AB1535
- Current owner: Aurizon; Ferrocarril de Antofagasta a Bolivia; Rail Heritage WA; Rusal
- Disposition: 13 in service, 2 preserved, 1 stored, 3 unknown, 6 scrapped

The WAGR A/AA/AB classes are classes of diesel locomotives built by Clyde Engineering, Granville, New South Wales, Australia, for the Western Australian Government Railways (WAGR) between 1960 and 1970.

== History ==
In July 1960 Clyde Engineering delivered the first of the WAGR's 14 A class locomotives. Six were assembled under contract by Commonwealth Engineering at Bassendean becoming the first diesel locomotives built in Western Australia. The last two were financed by Western Mining Corporation. A1506, A1513-14 were fitted with dynamic brakes.

In 1967 five improved AA class were delivered, followed by six AB classes in 1970. All were built at Granville and fitted with more powerful Electro Motive Diesel 12-645E engines.

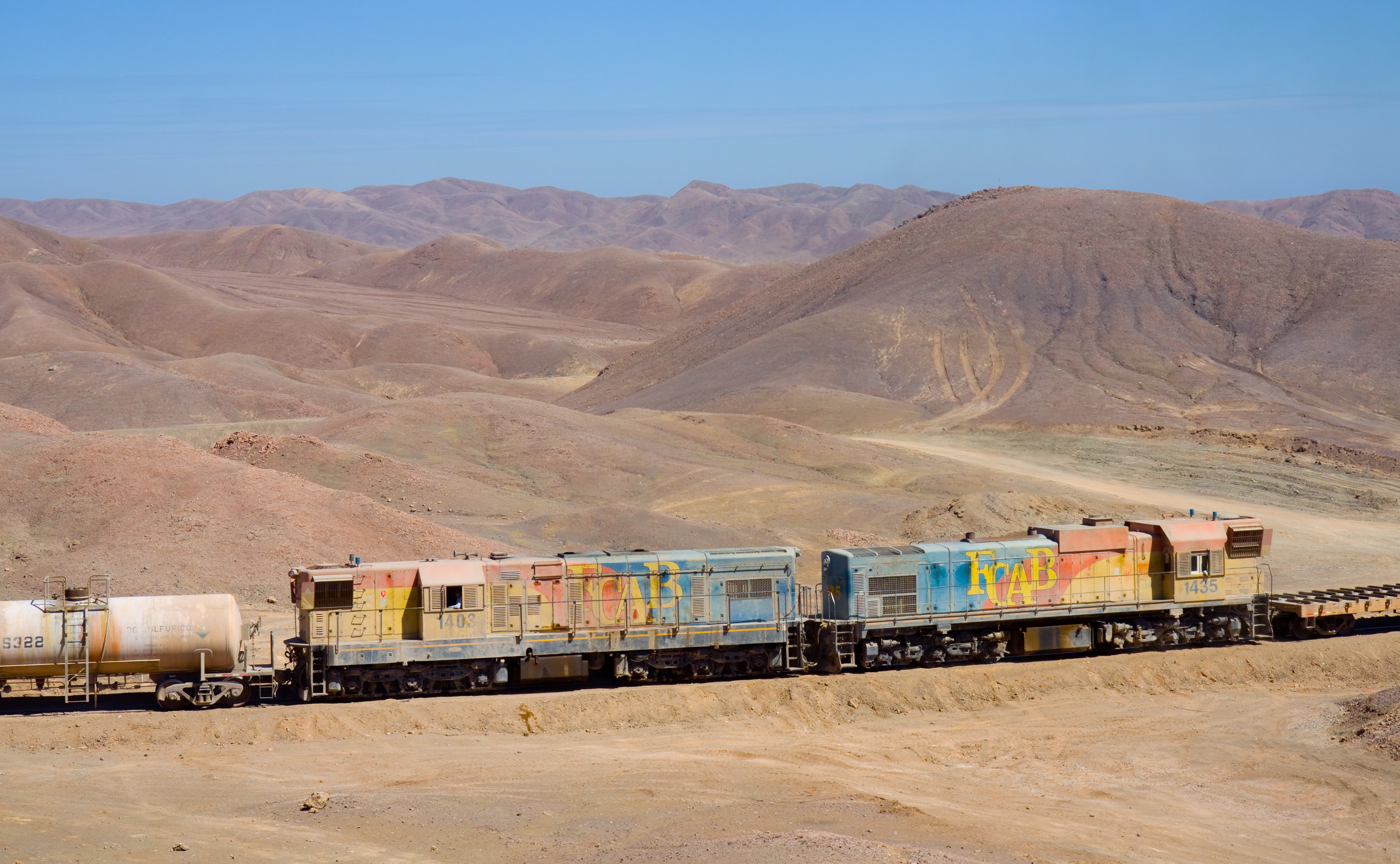
Former AA1518 (right) in service with Ferrocarril de Antofagasta a Bolivia in April 2012

In January 1998 ten (A1502-A1510 & AB1533) were sold to Tranz Rail. All were shipped to New Zealand in February 1998. Five were scrapped for parts, one sold to Tasrail for parts and in November 2005, four were sold as hulks to National Railway Equipment Company and shipped to Mount Vernon, Illinois. Two of the latter were rebuilt and in 2010 sold to Ferrocarril de Antofagasta a Bolivia. There they were reunited with seven (A1512, AA1515-AA1519 & AB1532) that had been sold to the Chile operator in September 1998.

Those remaining with Westrail were included in the sale of the business to Australian Railroad Group in October 2000. When the business was split in June 2006, A1513 and A1514 were transferred to Aurizon with the South Australian operations and were reclassified as the 1200 class while A1501 and the remaining four ABs passed to Aurizon with the Western Australian operations, and were renumbered AB1501-AB1504. In January 2008, A1501 was withdrawn and donated to Rail Heritage WA. A1202, AB1501 and AB1502 were exported to South Africa in January 2015.

In April 2017, AB1535 was donated to Rail Heritage WA for use with the Wheatbelt Heritage Rail Project at Minnivale.

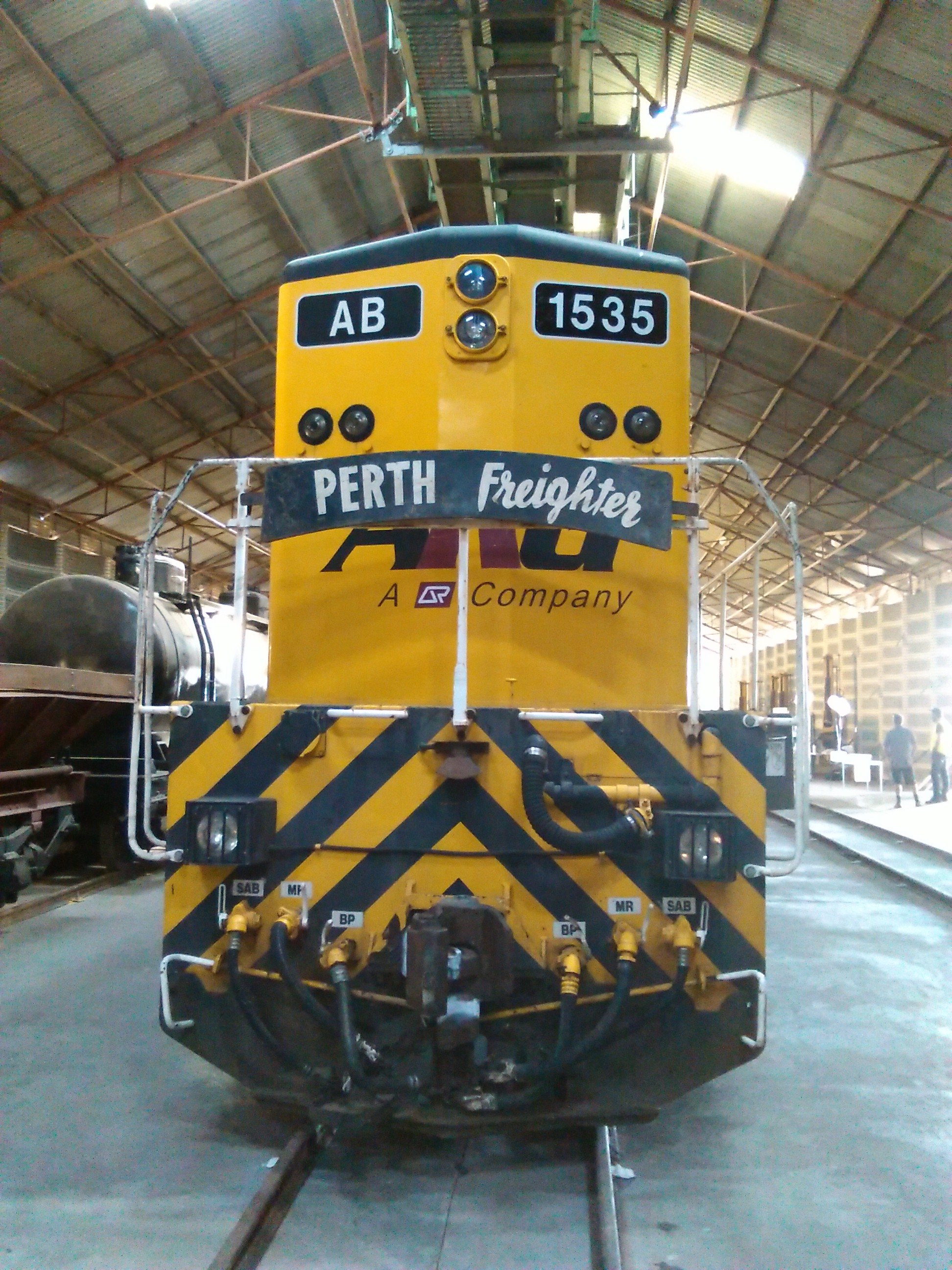
A portrait photo of ex-WAGR AB Class #1535 (previously owned by Australian Railroad Group, then owned by Aurizon), an EMD G22CU built by Clyde Engineering, Granville, New South Wales, Australia. Taken at the opening of "Stage 1" for Wheatbelt Heritage Rail (30 April 2017).

== Class list (A) ==
Key:	In Service	Withdrawn	Preserved	Converted	Unknown	Scrapped

Serial number	Date built	Original road number	Renumbered as	Current/Last Owner	Status
60-216	June 1960	A1501	-	Rail Heritage WA	Preserved, Western Australian Rail Transport Museum, Bassendean.
60-217	July 1960	A1502	1443	Ferrocarril de Antofagasta a Bolivia	Exported to Chile
62-263	September 1962	A1503	CC5	Rusal	Rebuilt by NREX with low short-end hood and converted to metre gauge, exported to Guinea for use on Conakry – Fria bauxite trains in 2008.
62-264	October 1962	A1504	CC6	Rusal	Rebuilt by NREX with low short-end hood and converted to metre gauge, exported to Guinea for use on Conakry – Fria bauxite trains in 2008.
62-265	October 1962	A1505	-	Tranz Rail	Scrapped
63-274	June 1963	A1506	-	Tranz Rail	Scrapped
64-371	December 1964	A1507	-	Tasrail	Exported to Tasmania for parts, later scrapped
64-372	February 1965	A1508	-	Tranz Rail	Scrapped
64-373	February 1965	A1509	-	Tranz Rail	Scrapped
65-374	April 1965	A1510	1444	Ferrocarril de Antofagasta a Bolivia	Exported to Chile
65-375	June 1965	A1511	1202	Rovos Rail	Exported to Durban, South Africa, January 2015
65-376	July 1965	A1512	1431	Ferrocarril de Antofagasta a Bolivia	Exported to Chile
65-427	December 1965	A1513	1203	Aurizon	Thevenard, Eyre Peninsula, as A class no. 1203
65-428	December 1965	A1514	1204	Aurizon	In service at Thevenard, Eyre Peninsula, as A class no. 1204

== Class list (AA) ==
Key:	In Service	Withdrawn	Preserved	Converted	Unknown	Scrapped

Serial number	Date built	Original road number	Renumbered as	Current/Last Owner	Status
67-534	August 1967	AA1515	1432	Ferrocarril de Antofagasta a Bolivia	Exported to Chile
67-535	September 1967	AA1516	1433	Ferrocarril de Antofagasta a Bolivia	Exported to Chile
67-536	October 1967	AA1517	1434	Ferrocarril de Antofagasta a Bolivia	Exported to Chile
67-537	October 1967	AA1518	1435	Ferrocarril de Antofagasta a Bolivia	Exported to Chile
67-538	November 1967	AA1519	1436	Ferrocarril de Antofagasta a Bolivia	Exported to Chile

== Class list (AB) ==
Key:	In Service	Withdrawn	Preserved	Converted	Unknown	Scrapped

Serial number	Date built	Original road number	Renumbered as	Current/Last Owner	Status
69-676	November 1969	AB1531	AB1501	Apex Industrial	Exported to South Africa, January 2015
69-677	December 1969	AB1532	1437	Ferrocarril de Antofagasta a Bolivia	Exported to Chile
69-678	February 1970	AB1533	-	Tranz Rail	Scrapped
69-679	February 1970	AB1534	AB1502	Apex Industrial	Exported to South Africa, January 2015
69-680	March 1970	AB1535	AB1503 (ARG), AB1535 (RHWA)	Rail Heritage WA	Preserved, currently leased to Watco for use on maintenance and construction trains
69-681	April 1970	AB1536	AB1504	Aurizon	Scrapped June 2026 (C. D. Dodd Forrestfield)
