= Poderosa =

Poderosa is a Peruvian mining company founded in 1980. The company employs approximately 780 workers. The company made international headlines in 2025 after several of its employees were allegedly murdered by illegal miners in the Department of La Libertad of Peru.
