= Illegal mining in Peru =

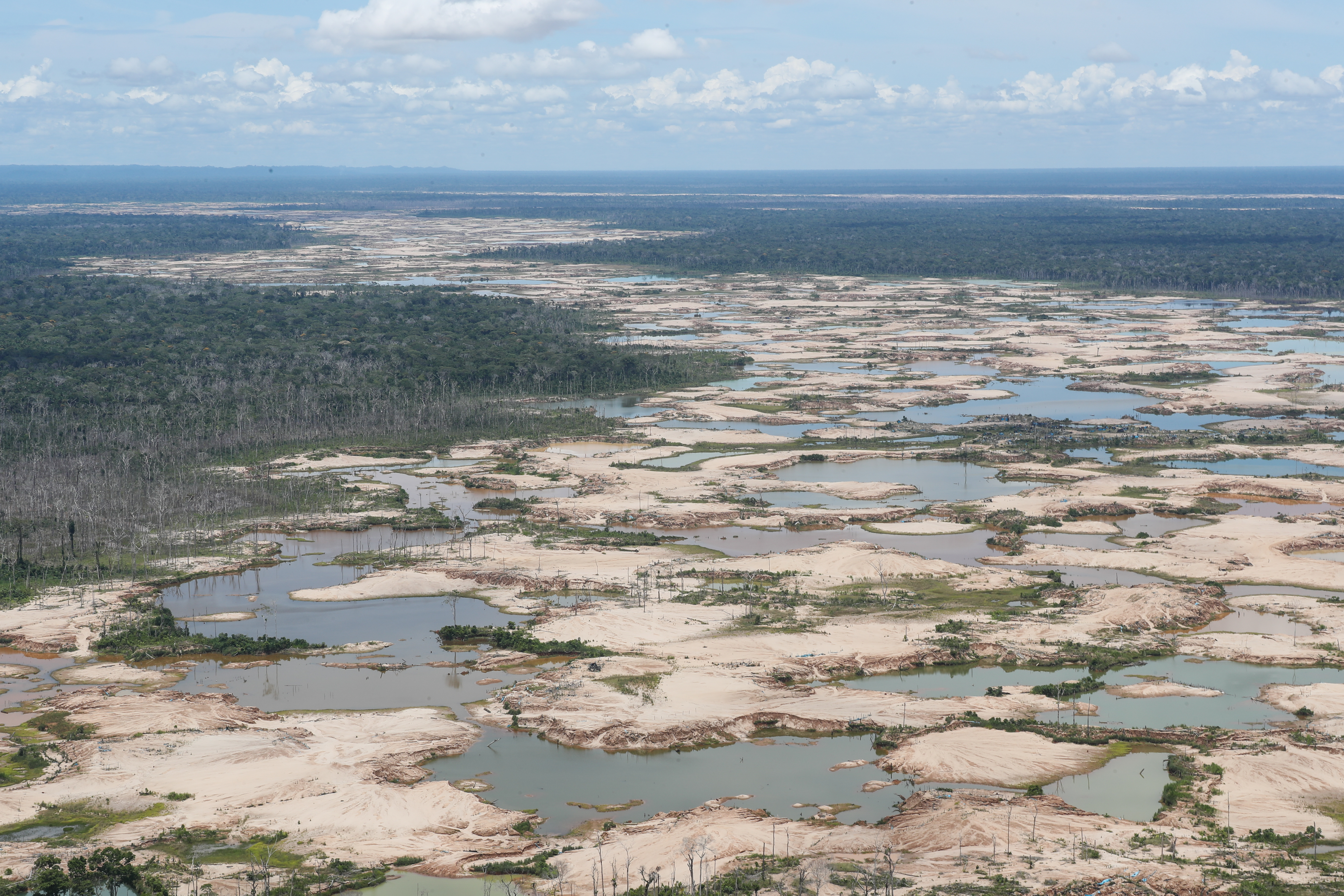
An area in Department of Madre de Dios (Amazon Basin) deforested and polluted by illegal mining.

Illegal mining or illegal mineral extraction is a common economic activity in Peru, which consists of the exploitation of metallic minerals (such as gold) and non-metallic minerals (clay, marble, among others) to finance criminal organizations. Illegal mining rose to prominence in the late 1970s with the emergence of informality in that sector. Illegal mining in Peru lacks social and environmental controls or regulations, a characteristic it shares with the artisanal mining sector in the country.

Those who carry out illegal mining act outside the control mechanisms of the Peruvian state and systematically evade relevant legal norms. Illegal mining operations are located mainly in the departments of Madre de Dios, Puno and La Libertad. In the case of the Amazon rainforest, 17 protected natural areas were compromised by it.

Peru is one of various countries in the region, such as Brazil, Colombia and Ecuador that have significant problems with illegal mining.

In the 2000s, in the Amazonian department of Madre de Dios, illegal exploitation of gold dramatically increased the recruitment and coercion of adolescents into prostitution through false employment offers.

== See also ==
- Environmental issues in Peru
- Illegal mining in Chile
- La Rinconada, Peru
- Pallaqueo
- Pirquinero
