= Ruinas de Huanchaca =

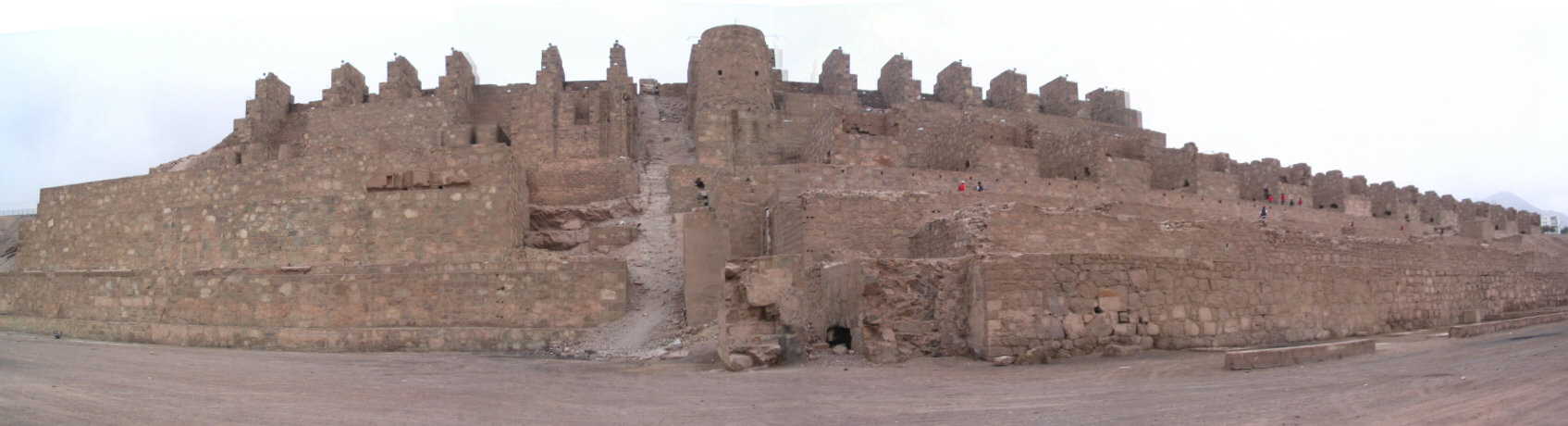
View of the ruins as of 2005.

Ruinas de Huanchaca (Quechua: "bridge of sorrow") is a former silver smelter in Antofagasta, Chile. The smelter was built from 1888 and 1892. Compañía Minera Huanchaca built the smelter together with Compañía de Salitres y Ferrocarril de Antofagasta. In 1902 this smelter ceased operations due to the instability of silver prices in the international market and the use of outdated smelter technology. In addition, the Pulacayo mine in Bolivia that supplied the smelter was flooded. Since January 7, 1974, it has been officially categorized as a National Historical Monument by Consejo de Monumentos Nacionales.
