= Queensland Railways 2100 class =

Class of Australian Co′Co′ diesel-electric locomotives

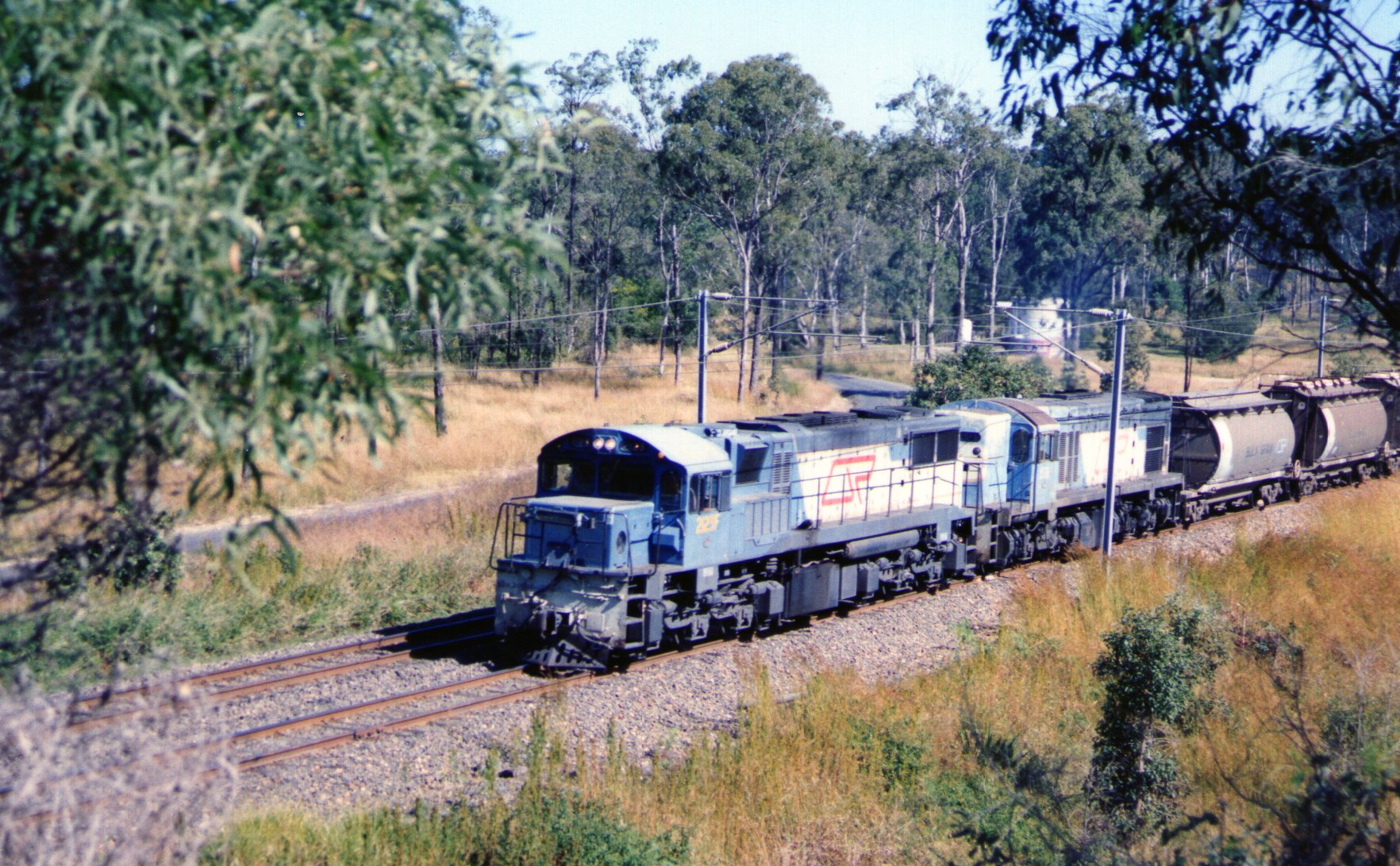
- 2123 and a 1460 class haul a grain train near Darra in 1990
Type and origin
- Power type: Diesel-electric
- Builder: Clyde Engineering, Eagle Farm
- Serial number: 70-711 to 70-716; 71-717 to 71-722; 72-740 to 72-751
- Model: Electro-Motive Diesel GL26C
- Build date: 1970-1973
- Total produced: 24
Specifications
- Configuration
  - UIC: Co-Co
- Gauge: 1,067 mm (3 ft 6 in)
- Length: 18.04 m (59 ft 2 in)
- Loco weight: 97.5 t (96.0 long tons; 107.5 short tons)
- Fuel type: Diesel
- Fuel capacity: 7,273 L (1,600 imp gal; 1,921 US gal)
- Prime mover: Electro-Motive Diesel 645E
- Engine type: V16 Diesel engine
- Aspiration: Roots blower
- Generator: Electro-Motive Diesel D32B
- Traction motors: Electro-Motive Diesel D29
- Cylinders: 16
- Loco brake: Dynamic
Performance figures
- Maximum speed: 80 km/h (50 mph)
- Power output: 1,491 kW (1,999 hp)
Career
- Operators: Queensland Railways
- Number in class: 24
- Numbers: 2100-2123
- First run: December 1970
- Current owner: Aurizon
- Disposition: 1 in service, 5 in service as 2300 class locomotives, 3 stored, 13 exported, 2 scrapped

The 2100 class is a class of diesel locomotives built by Clyde Engineering, Eagle Farm for Queensland Railways between 1970 and 1973.

== History ==
The 2100 class was built to haul coal trains on the Goonyella railway line. Because the new line had been built to a heavier standard than existing Queensland Railways lines, the 2100 class weighed in at 97.5 tonnes (96.0 long tons; 107.5 short tons) fully laden, a six-tonne (5.9-long-ton; 6.6-short-ton) increase on that previously permissible. To allow them to operate over existing lines, the 7,273-litre (1,600 imp gal; 1,921 US gal) tank had a compartment that could be blocked to bring their weight down to the required level.

The first 10 were financed by the developers of the Goonyella Riverside Mine, with another two purchased by Queensland Rail. Because the mine did not open until 1971, the first deliveries entered service hauling Brisbane area freight and suburban passenger services. A further 12 were purchased for the Peak Downs Mine.

In the final few months of the diesel-hauled Capricornian train, several 2100 class locomotives hauled these services. 2112 led 2450 hauled the service on 16 May 1989. 2113 hauled the northbound working train number #3371 on 22 June 1989. 2114 was a subject of a filming event where the locomotive hauled the Capricornian on 13 June 1989 whilst being filmed on a parallel run with a Special Light Engine movement between Mayne and Northgate stations. 2115 departed Roma Street Station, in Brisbane for the north bound run on 15 May 1989. On 15 June 1989, 2116 hauled the Rockhampton bound service. 2117 made two appearances on the Capricornian in the final weeks. On 19 May 1989, 2117 hauled train number #3371, the Capricornian headed north out of Roma Street Station. The final diesel drawn Capricornian service on 30 June 1989 was hauled by 2117 on the overnight run to Rockhampton arriving on 1 July 1989.

In the early 2000s, many were withdrawn. In September 2001, ten were sold to Ferrocarril de Antofagasta a Bolivia, Chile, and one (2177) in August 2013 to South Africa. Five were transferred to Queensland Rail subsidiary Australian Railroad Group in Western Australia after being overhauled by Downer Rail at Port Pirie.
