= Sociedad Contractual Minera =

Type of corporation in Chile

Sociedad Contractual Minera or SCM designates one of the two types companies allowed to engage in mining in Chile by the Chilean Mining Code, the other being the Sociedad Legal Minera or SLM. Sociedad Contractual Minera are regulated by six articles of the Chilean Mining Code and then more in general by the norms that apply to the Sociedad Legal Minera and by ius commune. Six articles in the Chilean Mining Code refer to the Sociedad Contractual Minera (200, 201, 202, 203, 204, 205). At the moment of creation a Sociedad Contractual Minera must have a stated goal to exploit a specific "mining manifestation" (Spanish: manifestación minera) as its main activity.

The shares of a Sociedad Contractual Minera can be sold as options.

== See also ==
- Illegal mining in Chile
- Law on Mining Concessions
- S.A. (corporation)
- Pirquinero
