= FC Caleta Coloso a Aguas Blancas =

The Ferrocarril Caleta Coloso a Aguas Blancas (Aguas Blancas Railway) was a 2 ft 6 in (762 mm) narrow gauge railway operating in the Antofagasta region of Chile, and was built to serve the nitrate workings southeast of Antofagasta. Opened in 1902 it was taken over by the Ferrocarril de Antofagasta a Bolivia in 1909. Never converted to 1,000 mm (3 ft 3 3/8 in) metre gauge like its parent, it retained 2 ft 6 in (762 mm) gauge track until it closed in 1961. Total length was 111 miles (179 km), and in 1958 it possessed 6 locomotives, 3 coaches, and 362 freight cars.
