= Pallaqueo =

Hand selection of mined ore fragments for further processing

In the Andean mining tradition pallaqueo, palleo or pirquineo is the hand selection of rock fragments with ore for further processing. Usually, pallaqueo is done in piles of discarded material with little planning, randomly and without authorization. However, historically in places like Potosí and Pulacayo in Bolivia, pallaqueo has been regarded as an integral part of the mining operation. Pallaqueo has the benefit that it can allow for high—or over-all increased—ore grades to be processed. In some places the selected rocks are sold to the local mining company, but this model has the drawback that it could incentivize smuggling of ore from the mine to make it pass as recovered through pallaqueo.

The term pallaqueo and palleo are derived from Quechua pállay. Those that practice pallaqueo are variously referred to as buscones, pallacos, pallaqueros, pallaqueadores and, in Bolivia, palliris. In some places like La Rinconada in Peru, this activity is primarily made by women known as pallaqueras, as they are otherwise not allowed to work inside the mines. For artisan miners known as pirquineros, pallaqueo is a secondary activity to proper mining.

The work of pallaqueros and pallaqueras can be physically demanding given possibilities of dissatisfaction—in the high Andes—also because of the cold climate.

Historically, the term pallaqueros applied sometimes also to any independent miner of surface ores, similar to what is today understood as a pirquinero, and they were important agents of mineral exploration.

== See also ==
- Chilean mill
- Sensor-based sorting
