= Ferrocarril de Antofagasta a Bolivia =

Narrow gauge railway line in Chile

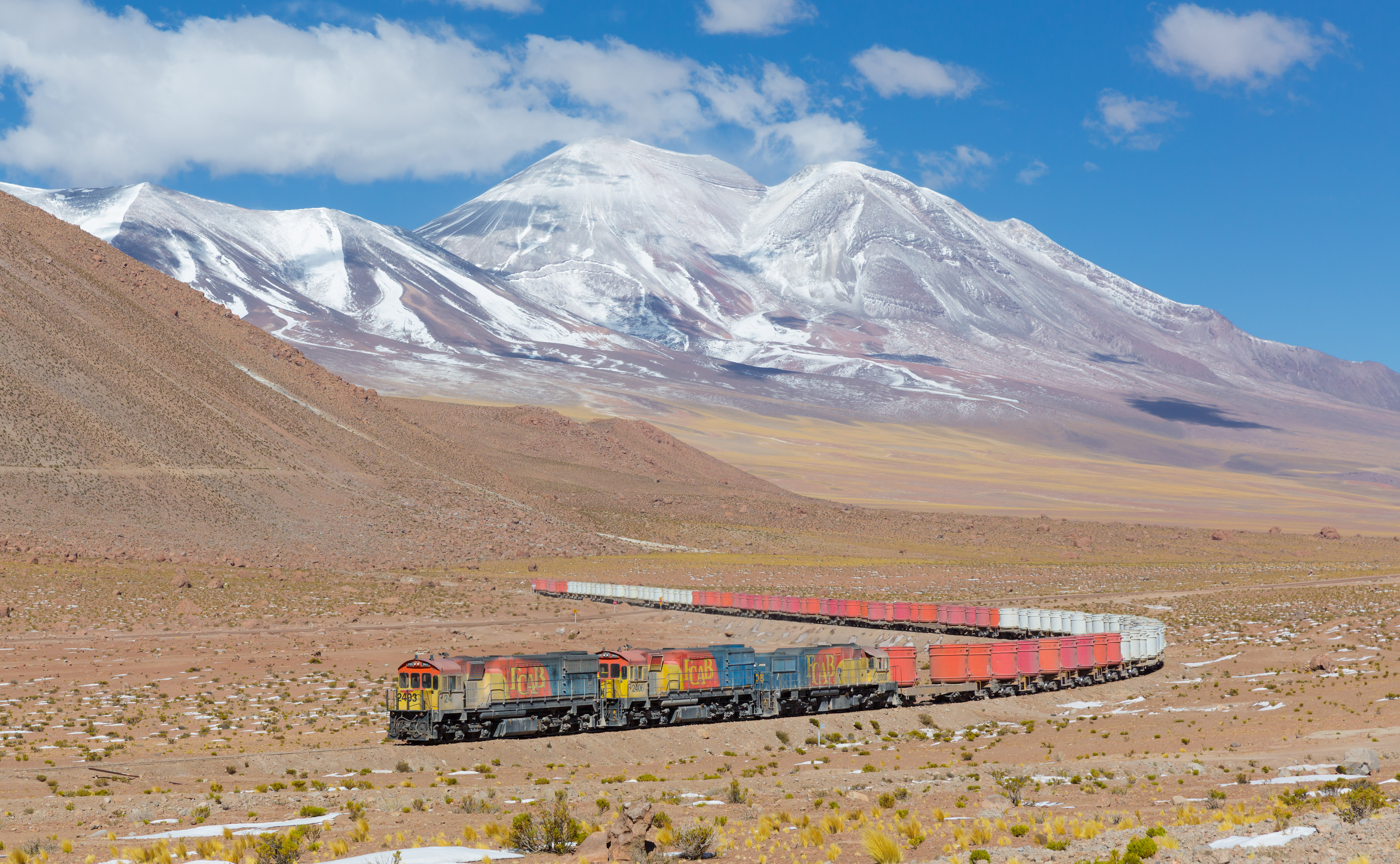

Overview
- Reporting mark: FCAB
- Locale: Northern Chile and Bolivia
- Dates of operation: 1873–present

Technical
- Track gauge: 1,000 mm (3 ft 3 3/8 in) metre gauge
- Previous gauge: 2 ft 6 in (762 mm)
- Length: 1,537 km (955 mi)
- No. of tracks: Single track with passing loops
- Highest elevation: 4,815 m (15,797 ft)

The Ferrocarril de Antofagasta a Bolivia (British company name: Antofagasta (Chili) & Bolivia Railway or FCAB for short) is a private railway operating in the northern provinces of Chile. It is notable in that it was one of the earliest railways built to 2 ft 6 in (762 mm) narrow gauge, with a route that climbed from sea level to over 4,500 m (14,764 ft), while handling goods traffic totaling near 2 million tons per annum. It proved that a railway with such a narrow gauge could do the work of a standard gauge railway, and influenced the construction of other railways such as the Estrada de Ferro Oeste de Minas. It was later converted to 1,000 mm (3 ft 3 3/8 in) metre gauge, and still operates today.

== Route ==
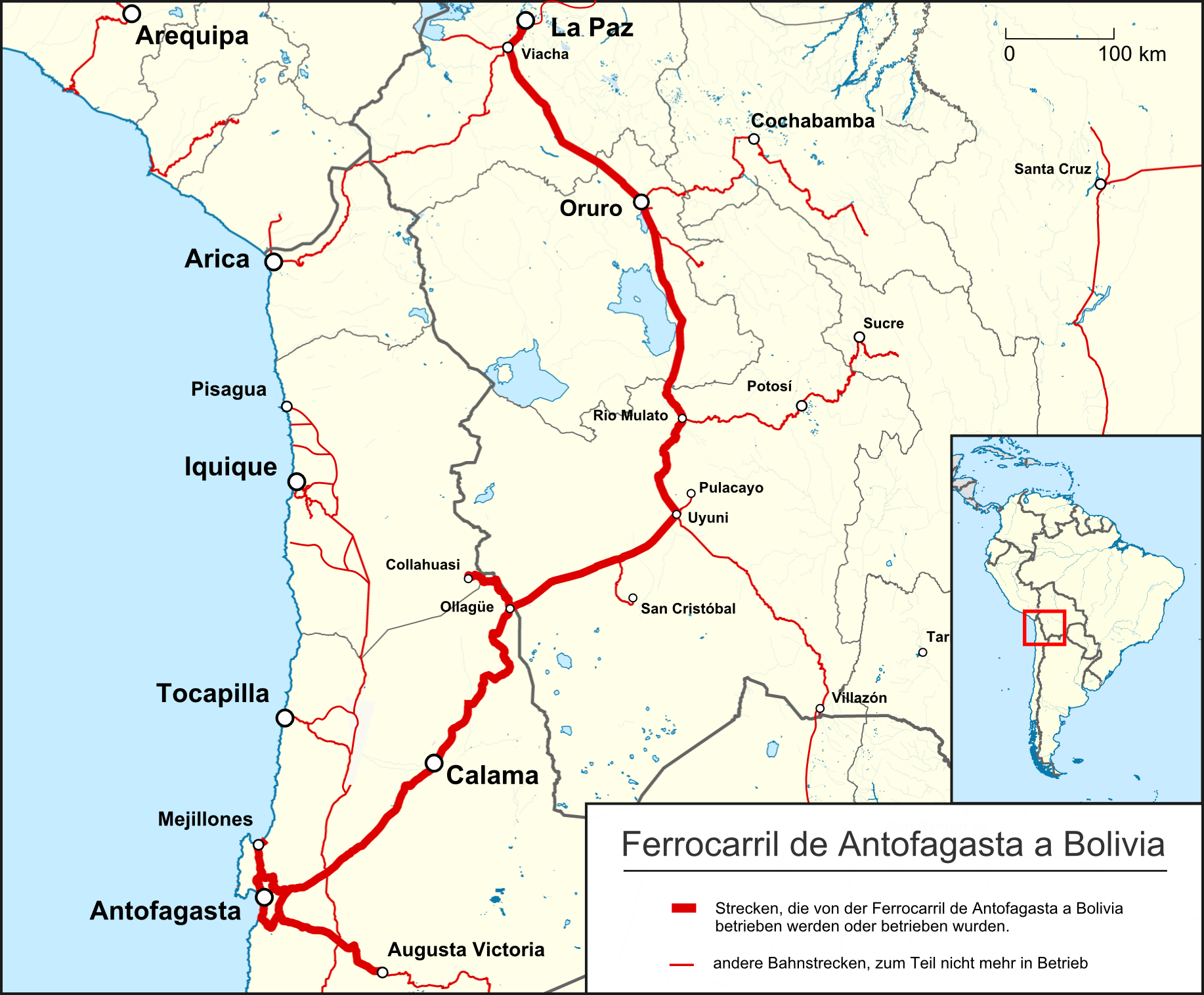
Modern route between La Paz and Pacific Ocean

The railway started at the Chilean port of Antofagasta. It proceeded up the front range of the Andes to Ollagüe on the Bolivian border, requiring a notable piece of civil engineering, the Loa viaduct. However, in 1914 the line was rerouted upstream of the Conchi reservoir and trains no longer ran across the viaduct. Across the Bolivian pampas the lined reached Uyuni and Oruro. At Oruro, the gauge changed to 1,000 mm (3 ft 3 3/8 in) metre gauge for the remainder of the route to La Paz, the capital of Bolivia. A number of branches were added to reach various mining fields. The Collahuasi mine branch from Ollagüe reached 4,815 m (15,797 ft) above sea level, regarded at the time of construction as the highest railway in the world. The total length of the 2 ft 6 in (762 mm) gauge lines, including branches and subsidiaries, was 1,537 km (955 mi).

== History ==
In Bolivia there had been proposals in the 1860s and early 1870s to establish Bolivia's first railway to the ports of the Pacific through the Peruvian por of Arica. A series of disputes with Peru shifted the focus of the railway to have it reach the ocean farther south through the Bolivian coastal department. The railway was expected to have great impact for the development of Bolivia increasing the state's income, integrating the peripheral coastal province, cheapen transport to coast and providing external trade that did not depend on third party. The Bolivian parliament originally rejected the plan since they favoured development of La Paz and Cochabamba in the north, the connection of these cities to the Peruvian ports and to maintain these regions as supply bases for southwestern Bolivia. Opposition by Compañía Minera Huanchaca's Chilean investors –who never controlled more than 1/5 of the company– was also a factor according to Guillermo Billinghurst. In Billinghurst's view Chilean interest were worried about an Litoral Department becoming increasingly Bolivian but then turned in favour of the railway once Chile took control of the region in 1879.

The history of the railway dates back to 1872 with the grant of a concession by the government of Bolivia to Melbourne Clarke & Co, the territory around Antofagasta being part of Bolivia at this date. The railway was organised as the Antofagasta Nitrate & Railway Company. Construction started in 1873, with the first section opening late in that year, motive power provided by mules. Steam locomotives were introduced in 1876, and by 1879 the railway had extended about 150 km (93.2 mi) into the interior.

War broke out in 1879 between Chile on one side, and Peru and Bolivia on the other. One of the causes of the war was an attempt by the Bolivian government to levy back taxes on the railway. The War of the Pacific ended in 1883, and Chile gained the region around Antofagasta as well as part of Peru.

Control of the railway passed to the Company Huanchaca of Bolivia in 1887, who subsequently floated the railway on the London stock exchange in 1888 as the FCAB. The Huanchilaca company retained the right to operate the railway for a further 15 years. The line reached Oruro in Bolivia, the end of the 2 ft 6 in (762 mm) section, in 1892, and branches continued to be added over subsequent years.

British business interests resumed control of the entire system in 1903. Traffic reached a point where the port of Antofagasta was unable to cope. A new port was opened to the north at Mejillones in 1906, together with a new line bypassing Antofagasta. In 1909 the FCAB purchased the FC Caleta Coloso a Aguas Blancas, a railway operating in the mineral-rich desert regions south of Antofagasta. Although also of 2 ft 6 in (762 mm) gauge, the FCCCAB was never integrated into the FCAB, and always operated as a separate entity.

The entire region is a desert, with almost no rainfall. The company constructed a system of pipes and reservoirs to bring water for the railway from the high Andes, eventually becoming responsible for supplying Antofagasta with water as well.

Bolivian government interests supported the construction of a railway between Oruro and the Bolivian capital, La Paz, and this line was opened in stages between 1908 and 1913. This line was constructed to metre gauge, and was leased to the FCAB. The FCAB now had two operating divisions, one using 2 ft 6 in (762 mm) gauge, the other 1,000 mm (3 ft 3 3/8 in) metre gauge.

=== Bogie exchange ===
The FCAB already interchanged with metre gauge railways running north–south in western Chile, and there was the prospect of connections with lines from Argentina. Thus, in 1913, the FCAB board made a decision to convert the line to metre gauge throughout. Some gauge conversion work was done in 1916, however World War I intervened, and most work was not done until 1928. In the meantime, the railway became proficient in changing bogies on freight cars between gauges at interchange points. Some branch lines and connecting railways were never converted, and continued to operate as 2 ft 6 in (762 mm) gauge railways into the 1960s.

The Bolivian section of the line was taken over by the Bolivian government in 1964, and in the early 1970s, the Chilean government investigated nationalizing the line. In 1982, control of the company passed on to Chilean interests, and the head office moved from London to Antofagasta. The railway is now part of the transport division of mining company Antofagasta plc.

== Traffic ==
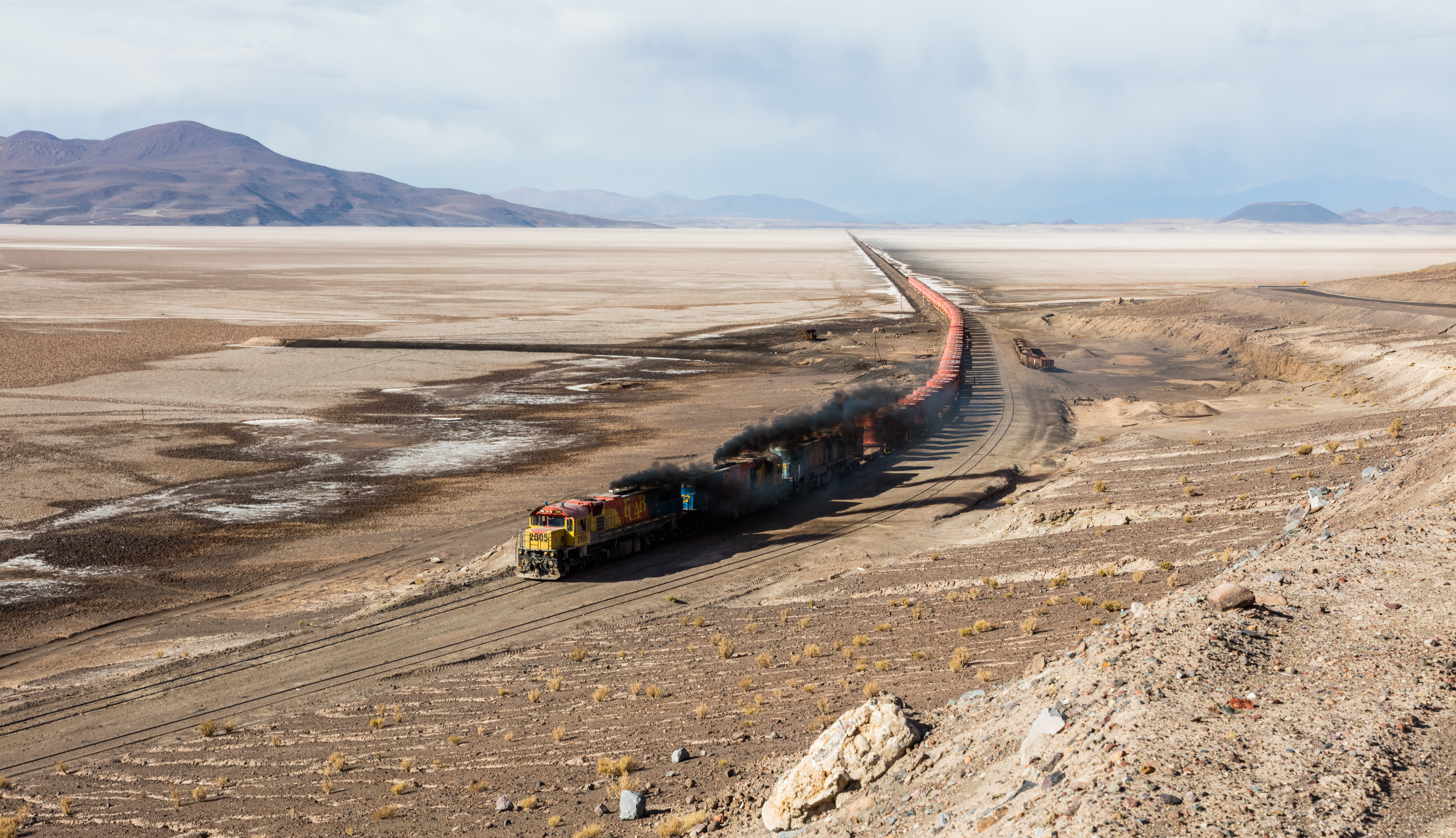
FCAB crossing the Carcote salt flat

Primary traffic on the railway has always been mineral, first with nitrate (an essential ingredient of explosives prior to World War I) and as of 2020 copper being very important. Sulphuric acid is transported uphill and copper comes down. The railway also transported concentrates of other minerals and lithium brine. Traffic between Bolivia and northern Chile grew in importance and continues to this day.

Passengers were catered for in earlier days by a luxury train with sleeping and dining carriages, one of the few trains on 2 ft 6 in (762 mm) gauge anywhere in the world with these conveniences. The International, as the train was called, continued to operate on the metre gauge after gauge conversion. The train was later replaced by railcars, however no passenger service is provided today except south of Oruro with the Wari Wari del Sur running several times a week and serving several stations en route.

== See also ==
- Arica–La Paz railway
- FC Caleta Coloso a Aguas Blancas
- Salta–Antofagasta railway
- Tocopilla railway
- Rail transport in Chile
- Rail transport in Bolivia

== Sources ==
- Turner, J M; Ellis, R F (1992). The Antofagasta (Chili) & Bolivia Railway. Locomotives International narrow gauge special. Skipton, North Yorkshire, England: Locomotives International. ISBN 9780907941361. OCLC 36761171.
- "Company history". About us. Antofagasta PLC. Archived from the original on 2 October 2012.
- Vasallo, Emilio; Matus, Carlos (1943). Ferrocarriles de Chile Historia y Organización. Santiago de Chile.
