= Illegal mining =

Mining without state permission

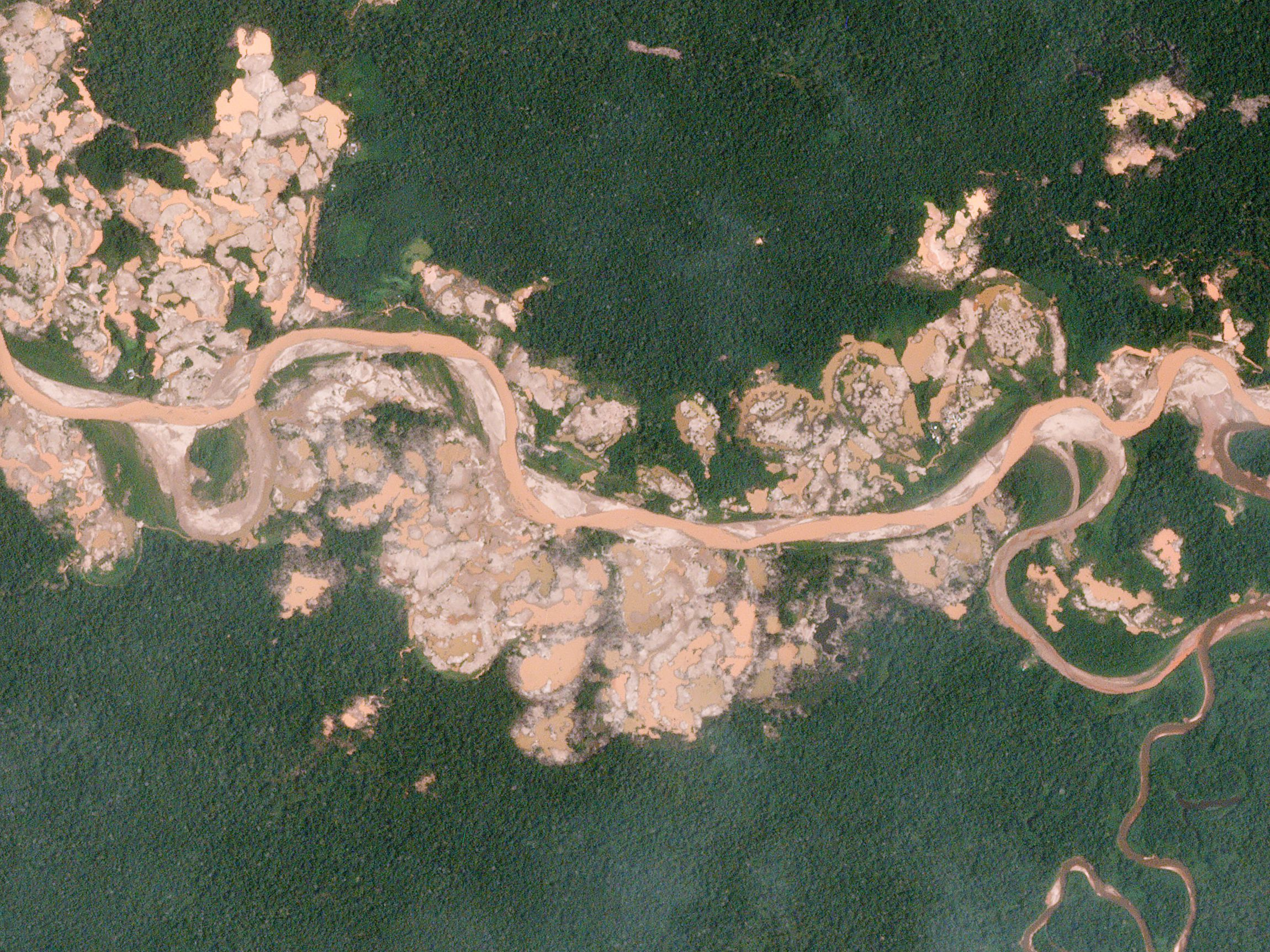
Aerial view of La Pampa gold mine's illegal expansion into Peru's Tambopata National Reserve

Illegal mining is mining activity that is undertaken without state permission. Illegal mining is the extraction of precious metal and or rocks without following the proper procedures to participate in legal mining activity. These procedures include permits and licenses for exploration of the land, mining and transportation, as well as safety regulations concerning miners and other workers.

Unauthorized mining can be a subsistence activity, as is the case with artisanal mining, or it can belong to large-scale organized crime, spearheaded by illegal mining syndicates. On an international level, approximately 80 percent of small-scale mining operations can be categorized as illegal. Despite strategic developments towards "responsible mining," even big companies can be involved in illegal mineral digging and extraction, if only on the financing side.

Large-scale mining operations are owned by large companies and use advanced technology to extract metals such as open-pit mining. Artisanal small-scale mining operations are often labour-intensive because miners do not tend to use machinery to extract the metals. Informal mining occurs when artisanal small-scale mining operations proceed without the proper legal licenses.

These operations are still illegal but it is not an indictable offence in the same manner as illegal mining operations organized by criminal groups. Criminally organized illegal mining are often large-scale operations that violate all applicable laws. Organized crime groups lead and control illegal mining activity in extremely rural areas where the state does not have full jurisdiction over the land. Corruption in privately owned large-scale mining and artisanal small-scale mining operations occurs because the operations delegate their power to local authorities.

== Environmental impacts ==
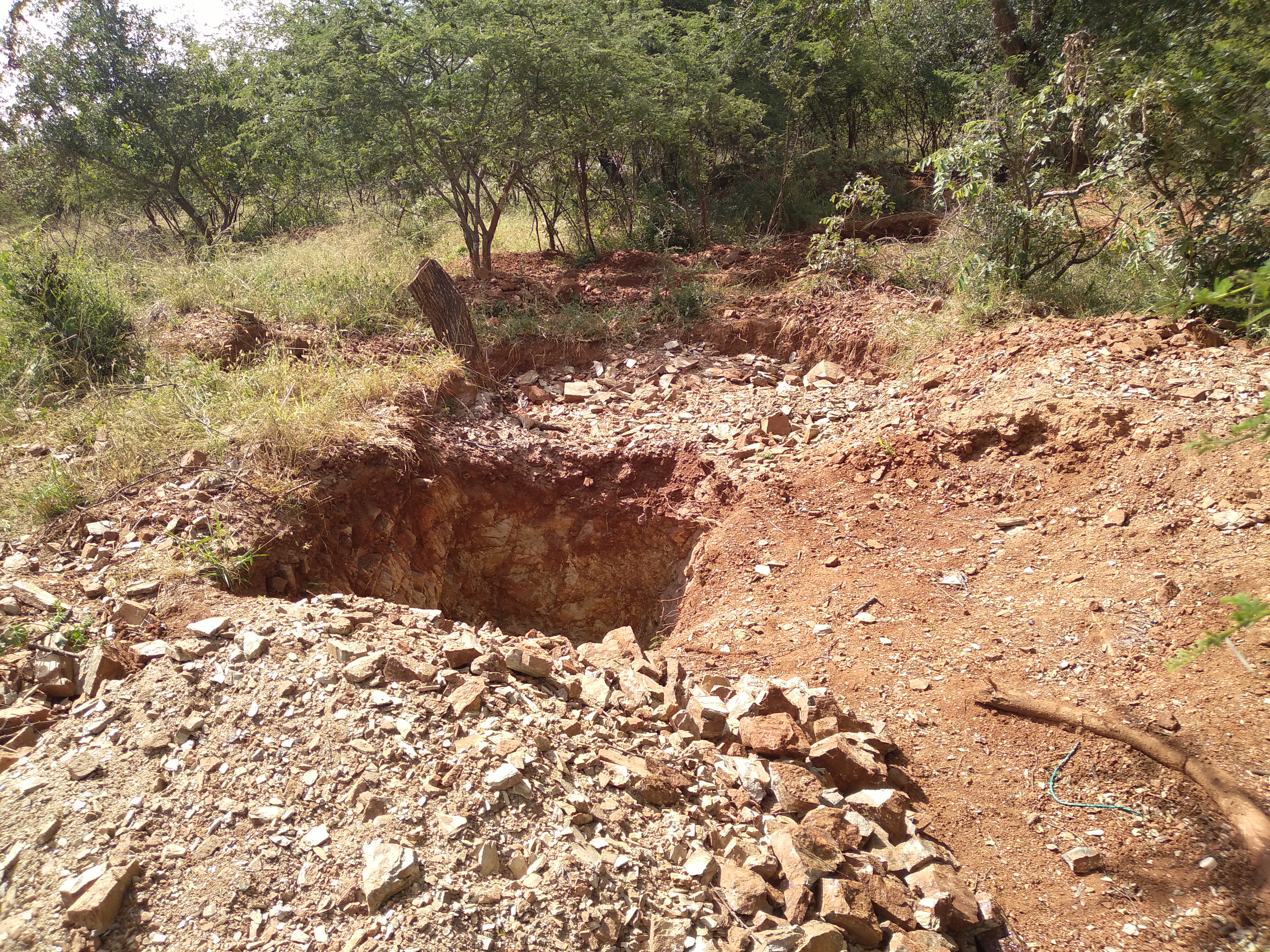
Abandoned surface illegal mining shaft

Certified mining causes less threat and destruction to the environment than illegal mining because the guidelines they are required to follow aim to preserve the environment while extracting resources. Illegal miners generally lack knowledge or simply do not care about the environment they are mining. Illegal mining can destroy ecosystems in a variety of ways. One of the simplest methods is the creation large mining pits that are not back-filled when they are finished, causing many people and animals to die from these pits.

=== Water pollution ===
Illegal gold mining operations often use heavy metals such as mercury and cyanide to extract gold from waste material. The mercury and cyanide leaches into the natural environment causing pollution. Illegal miners often dump excess mercury into the nearby waterways for disposal. Water pollution affects surrounding aquatic and land ecosystems due to the hydraulic cycle. The polluted water is also used for irrigation of farmland and as drinking water, which further spreads pollution and leads to illness and death.

=== Deforestation ===
Deforestation is one of the primary problems caused by illegal mining. As forests are clear-cut and the ground is mined, ecosystems collapse due to habitat loss and carbon emissions increase drastically. There have been many efforts to protect and rehabilitate forest ecosystems in recent years to prevent and limit the effects of deforestation.

=== Soil erosion and degradation ===
Deforestation by itself contributes to soil erosion since the roots of trees provide the soil with stability. Illegal mining can also cause soil degradation. Removing topsoil affects the fertility of the soil and decreases the chance of restoring vegetation, toxic chemicals pollute soil to an extent where plants cannot grow, and large amounts of mining waste such as rock, sediment and soil that lacks nutrients are dumped onto the land, engulfing the fertile topsoil and stopping the growth of plants. Poorly contained mining tails are hazardous to the environment because there are no efforts to treat the soil to get rid of toxic chemicals. Soil erosion can also lead to natural hazards such as landslides due to loose soil and flooding.

== Social impacts ==
=== Crime ===
Illegal mining is by its very nature a criminal activity, but is often linked to other criminal activities taking place in the same area. For example, organized crime groups such as drug cartels in Latin America realized the profitability of illegal mining and began to mine precious metals. These groups were able to get control of large amounts of land away from government surveillance. This allowed the cartels to earn a larger profit with lower risk, compared to the drug trade. Child labour is very common in the mines because children are traficked and forced into work. Adults are also exploited, trafficked and forced to work in unsafe labour conditions.

=== Farming ===
Illegal mining operations affect surrounding agriculture. For example, cocoa farming in Ghana is impacted by illegal mining activity because of land degradation and availability. There is less available land for farming causing competition and higher costs for farmers. The illegal miners trespass through farmland to construct roads through farms, destroying the cocoa tree in the process. They also mine on the farmland, causing many farmers to die due to falling into the pits. Illegal mining operations cause flooding with polluted water that affects the maturation of the cocoa pods, depletes soil fertility, increases erosion, and degrades the farmer's ability to grow cocoa trees.

=== Malaria ===
Abandoned open-pit mines fill up with stagnant or slow-moving water where mosquitoes can breed and their larvae can grow. This can cause an increase in the mosquito population which can increase the spread of malaria. When illegal mining operations abandon their pits, there is no way for local authorities to track and prevent the open pits to decrease the spread. Illegal miners may also not take proper precautions to protect themselves when mining, increasing the risk of transmission.

== Regional issues ==
=== Sub-Saharan Africa ===
Spurred by widespread poverty and a lack of alternative income-earning opportunities, illegal artisanal mining is a well-documented phenomenon in sub-Saharan Africa. While legalization opportunities for artisanal and small-scale mining are often available, inefficient government bureaucracy structures can make noncompliance more appealing for workers. In addition, to attract foreign investment, many governments in sub-Saharan Africa have loosened national mining investment codes. An expansion of large-scale mining projects fuelled by foreign investment has displaced rural mining communities, many of which revert to illegal mining on concessions given to the formal mining sector. Some countries have responded to these issues - for example, Ghana launched Operation Vanguard in 2017 to restrain illegal artisanal mining in Ghana.

=== Latin America ===
Latin America is home to the Amazon rainforest which contains many ecosystems. Illegal mining causes deforestation of this protected rainforest. The use of mercury in illegal mining contaminates the soil, water and air, harming surrounding communities and the wildlife living in the forest. In Latin America, the illegal mining population is more likely to be infected with malaria since they are more vulnerable when they are mining deep in the rainforest.

Illegal mining operations are often located in remote areas, making it more difficult to enforce mining standards. Furthermore, mining requirements can vary substantially from region to region, further complicating adherence with labor laws, environmental regulations, and tax legislation. Emissions of mercury originating in artisanal mining, most of which is unregulated and illegal, are substantial, contributing to 37 percent of the atmospheric mercury emitted annually.

While drug trafficking has historically been a prominent criminal enterprise, lower risks associated with illegal mining have propelled a shift toward lucrative illegal gold mining operations. In order to transfer illegal gold into the marketplace, criminal actors sometimes attempt to mask its illicit origins by melting together processed legal and illegal gold. This gold laundering task is generally facilitated by middlemen who falsify documentation to ease the transition into the legitimate international marketplace.

The 2020–2022 COVID-19 pandemic caused an increase in illegal mining in Latin America, due to the disruption of precious metal supplies caused by anti-Covid measures in legal mines, increased gold prices, and a surge in unemployment.

=== India ===
Mining scams in India (colloquially known as the Indian mining scam) refer to a series of alleged widespread scams in various ore-rich states of India, which have generated controversy. Problems caused by the alleged scams include encroachment of forest areas, underpayment of government royalties, and conflict with tribals regarding land rights. The spill-over of the effects of legal mining into issues such as Naxalism, and the distortion of the Indian political system by mixed politics and mining interests, has gained international attention.

The latest scam that has come out is the coal mining scam in which the government has had a presumable conservative loss of Rs 1.86 trillion (short scale), due to the delayed implementation of a competitive bidding process for allotment of coal blocks, according to the Comptroller and Auditor General of India (CAG).

=== Nigeria ===
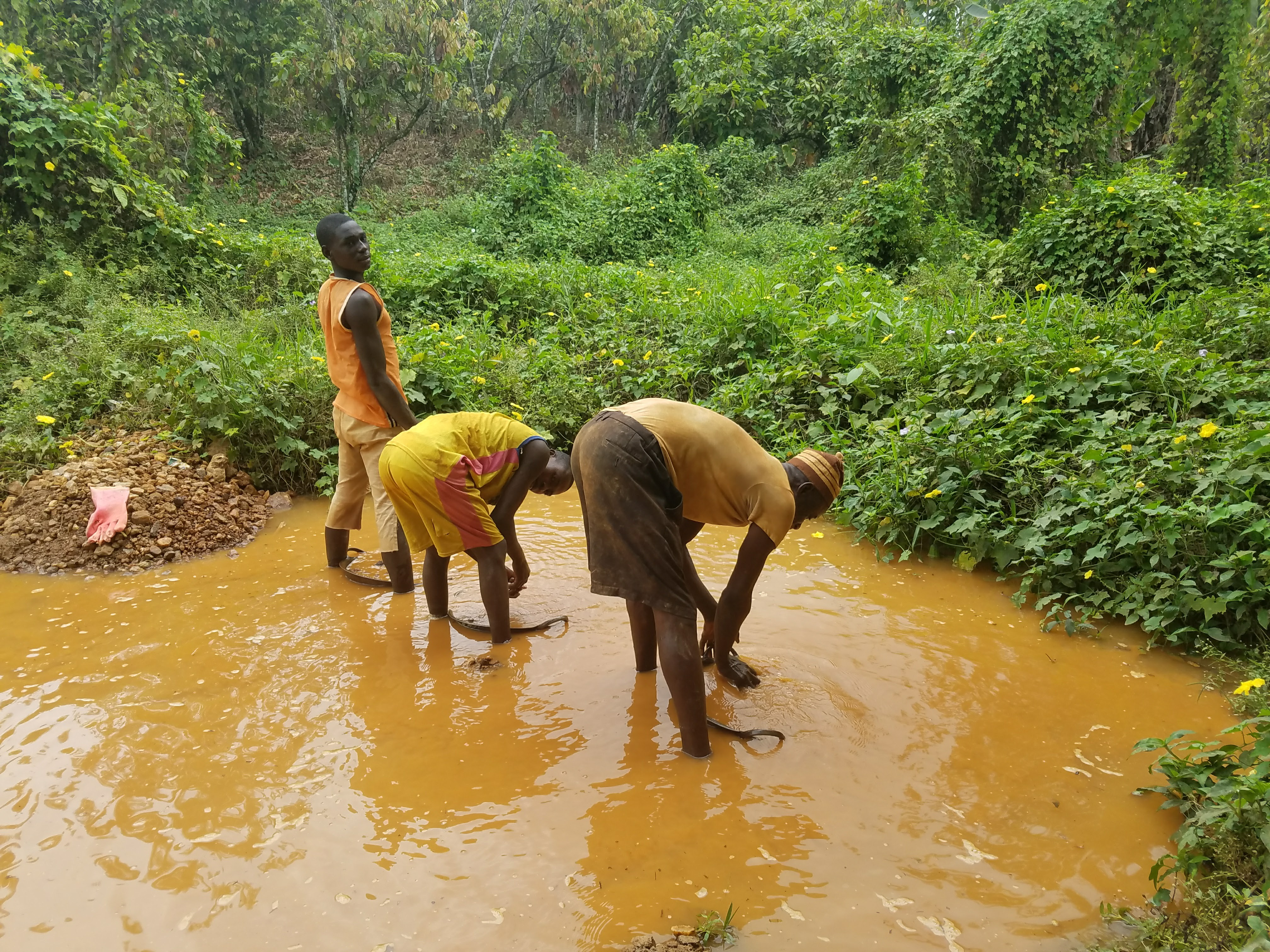
Illegal artisanal small-scale gold mining in Nigeria

Nigeria is rich in precious metals, attracting foreign mining enterprises. This causes violence and conflict between the local and foreign illegal miners in some parts of Nigeria. The Nigerian government does not have the funds, capacity or authority needed to enforce the law that prohibits illegal mining and the government cannot profit from the illegal extraction of metals. The vastness of Nigeria also means that illegal mining operations can occur in remote locatios without the government having any knowledge of it.

=== Ghana ===
In Ghana, the government has put together a task force to remove all illegal mining operations due to the environmental problems it has caused. The environmental and water quality deterioration caused the President of Ghana to make a press release explaining the urgency and need for public support to aid in fixing the problem.

Illegal mining operations in Ghana have contributed to the reduction of poverty. Illegal mining is an employment option for men and women with no education and it is an easy way to make quick money. The government is offering alternative sources of income in the agricultural field. Illegal miners will continue to make money once their mine is shut down or change jobs to work an agricultural job that is much safer and legal.

== See also ==
- Artisanal mining
- Blood diamond
- Bootleg mining
- Mining law
- Sand theft
- Galamsey
