= Pulacayo =

Coordinates: 20°23′28″S 66°42′00″W

The historic industrial site of Pulacayo is located in the Potosí Department of Bolivia. The mining center developed around Huanchaca, the world's second largest silver mine, and was founded in 1833. Features of the mining center include:

- Aniceto Arce’s house
- The Maestranza
- The refinery’s smelting works
- A spinning mill
- The first railroad to ever reach Bolivia

Pulacayo also contains a train that Butch Cassidy and the Sundance Kid robbed.

== World Heritage Status ==
This site was added to the UNESCO World Heritage Tentative List on July 1, 2003, in the Cultural category.
