= Water jacket furnace (metallurgy) =

Blast furnace for smelting non-ferrous ores

A water jacket furnace is a type of blast furnace used to smelt non-ferrous metallic ores, most typically ores of copper, lead, or silver-lead. In a modified form it could also recover zinc. It takes its name from the water jacket arrangement used to cool the lower furnace casing and prolong the life of the furnace hearth. It is sometimes referred to as a water-jacketed blast furnace, copper blast furnace, or lead blast furnace. The water jacket furnace is now virtually an obsolete technology for copper smelting, being nearly entirely replaced, by flash smelting of copper ore concentrates. It remains in use, in a modified form, for lead smelting.

The terminology is also used for an indirect heating device used in the petroleum oil and gas industry, generally known as a water jacket heater or water bath heater, which should not be confused with the metallurgical water jacket furnace.

== History ==
In the mid 19th Century, most non-ferrous smelting was done using reverberatory furnaces. Blast furnaces were used to smelt sulphide copper ore in the Harz Mountains of Germany. The mines at Burra in South Australia tried to adopt the technology, in 1847, but without success because the German furnace design, using horse-powered bellows to provide the air blast, was not well suited to their carbonate copper ore. There were two other attempts at reducing (roasted or 'calcinated') copper ore to metallic copper, in blast furnaces, in Australia; the Rosemorrin smelter (c. 1847 — c.1849) at Woolwich, now a suburb of Sydney, and the Carangara Mine smelter (1850 — 1851), at Cornish Settlement, now Byng, New South Wales.

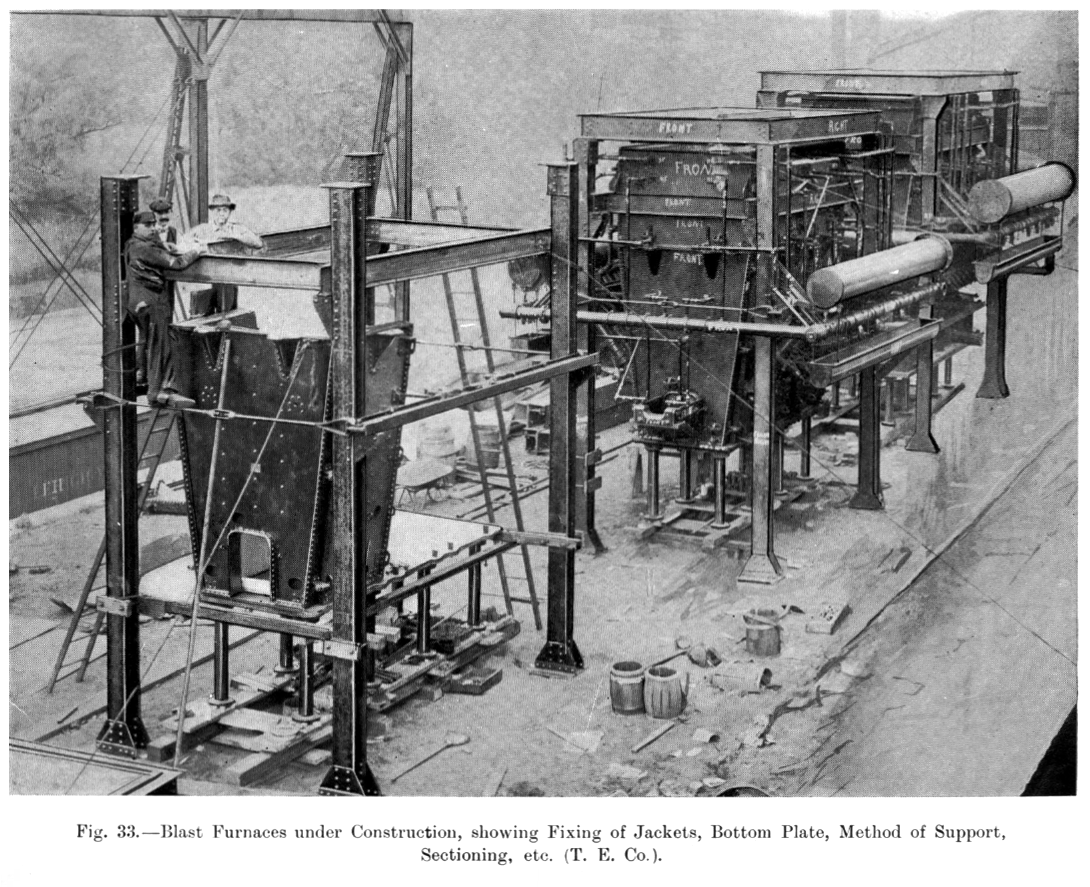
Water jacket furnaces under construction

The 'water jacket' blast furnace design for non-ferrous smelting arose in North America, during the 1870s, and an alternative name for it, in Australia, was 'American water jacket furnace'. The design evolved from earlier German cupola furnace designs, with the distinguishing innovation being a well-controlled cooling of the furnace shell.

Water jacket furnaces began to be common in the later part of the century, from the 1880s, particularly for smelting sulphide ores. Unlike reverberatory furnaces, water jacket furnaces could be made in a factory and then assembled at site.

Not all situations and ores were well-suited to water jacket furnace operation. Some attempts to apply them were costly failures, such as at the North Lyell mine, at Crotty, Tasmania, and Lloyd's Mine at Burraga and the Overflow Mine at Bobadah, both in New South Wales. However, the furnaces were hugely successful, when well applied, such as at the vast Anaconda Copper Mine, in Butte, Montana, the Mt Lyell Mine in Tasmania, and at many other mines.

Water jacket furnaces only ever partially displaced reverberatory furnaces in the copper industry, until both furnace types were displaced, almost entirely, by flash smelting, between around 1949 and 1980.

== Technology and application ==
=== Smelting ===
==== Lead and silver-lead ore smelting ====
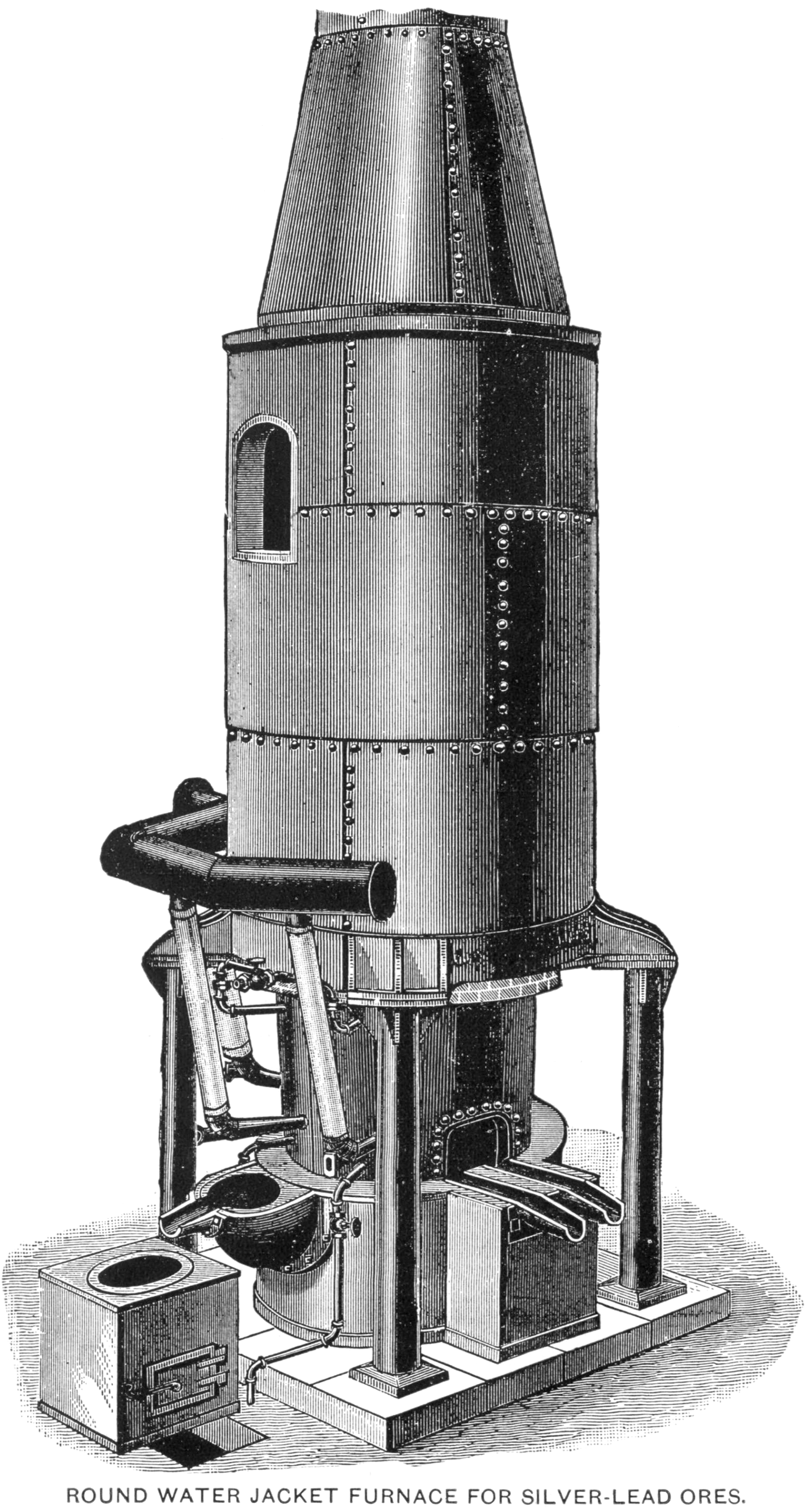
Small round water jacket furnace for silver-lead ore, 1897.

A water jacket furnace can be used to reduce non-ferrous oxide ores mixed with coke, to produce metal and slag. When smelting lead, the feedstock is lead oxide, coke and fluxes. When smelting lead sulphide ores, the ore is first sintered to form a lead oxide sinter. Lead and silver ores often occur in the same ore body. Separating silver metal from the crude lead produced by a furnace requires a second process of refining, such as the Parkes process. When smelting lead, there was the added complication that measures were necessary to protect workers from harmful lead vapours.

==== Copper ore smelting ====
The pyrometallurgical process of a water jacket furnace, when smelting copper sulphide ores, was fundamentally different to a conventional blast furnace used to make iron, or a water jacket furnace used to make lead. The conventional blast furnace process produces molten metal by reducing the ore, and separating out the silica as slag. Water jacket furnaces, when smelting sulphide copper ores, used an oxidation reaction that produces molten copper matte, which must be further treated in a convertor (similar in concept to a Bessemer convertor) or reverberatory furnace to produce copper metal. The product of that conversion process is known as blister copper. If a smelter did not have a convertor, the matte was poured into moulds and allowed to solidify.

The smelting of sulphide copper ores in a water jacket furnace can be viewed as concentrating the non-ferrous metallic portion of the ore, as matte, and separating out some impurities, such as silica and iron, in the mainly iron silicate slag, and much of the sulphur, as sulphur dioxide in the off-gas. The molten slag and matte separate, with the denser molten matte accumulating at the bottom of the furnace, with a layer of molten slag immediately above it.

Depending upon the composition of the ore being smelted, the choice of a suitable flux was particularly important. Fluxes used could be limestone, iron oxide, or silica (quartz), depending upon what was needed to create slag and to minimise the loss of copper with that slag. When both 'basic' (oxide or carbonate) ores and 'siliceous' sulphide ores were available, feeding the furnaces with a mixture of the two copper ore types reduced the amount of other fluxes needing to be added.

=== Advantages and disadvantages ===
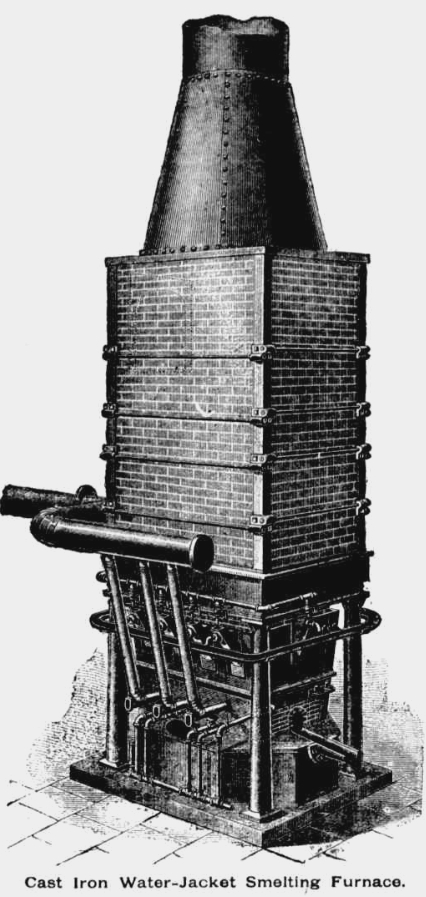
Rectangular cross-section water jacket furnace. The charging doors are at the top on the side that is not visible.

Water jacket furnaces had some advantages over reverberatory furnaces. Fuel consumption was lower. Sulphide copper ores could be smelted without first roasting the ore. Production per furnace was generally higher. Low grade ore could be smelted, because the water jacket furnace could more readily discharge large amounts of molten slag. Because solidified slag is unsuitable to backfill the voids (stopes) created by underground mining, disposal of large volumes of slag, from smelting of low grade ores, was a significant problem. Some mines treated molten slag with water to create granulated slag, which could be used to backfill stopes. Otherwise, the molten slag was dumped and large slag dumps accumulated near the smelter, becoming a lasting legacy of smelting operations.

Another advantage of the water jacket furnace was that, while out of service, the bottom of the furnace, if so designed, could be 'dropped' for cleaning it up or for repair. Over time, a significant amount of copper material would accumulate in the bottom of a reverberatory furnace which could not be accessed without effectively demolishing the furnace.

A disadvantage of the water jacket furnace was that it could not handle fine ore well and was so was better suited to lump ore. Fines tended to either choke the furnace or were blown into the flue by the air blast. Eventually, the second problem, only, would be solved by capturing the flue dust and recycling it.

An initial disadvantage of the water jacket furnace was its use of coke as fuel. It could not use the cheaper fuels such as firewood or fine raw coal that could be used to fire a reverberatory furnace. That disadvantage was offset by lower overall fuel consumption. In the first years of the 20th Century, the perfection of a technique known as pyritic smelting greatly reduced coke consumption, when smelting suitable ores such as chalcopyrite, by optimizing the use of the sulphur and iron in the ore itself, as a fuel generating heat. The iron oxide so produced combined with molten silica to form an iron silicate slag.

Water jacket furnaces needed blowers and a cooling water supply, and were more complex to build and operate than the reverberatory furnaces. However, they were also more versatile, being a readily scalable technology; large or small furnaces could be made, and would operate effectively.

Water jacket furnaces, like other blast furnaces, are best operated continuously, and smelters that used them had to work continuously too. However, this was in one way an advantage over reverberatory furnaces that operated as a batch process with around 24 hours typical duration. The associated cycles of heating and cooling of a reverberatory furnace led, over time, to damage of its masonry and higher maintenance and downtime as a result. In contrast, a well-operated water jacket furnace might achieve years of operation before needing new fire bricks.

=== Differences from conventional blast furnace design ===
The internal operating temperature of the water jacket furnace is lower than that of a blast furnace used to make iron, and the process does not depend upon the formation of a bosh shell, as is critical in the operation of a blast furnace making iron.

Conventional blast furnaces used for smelting iron ore use a hot blast. Water jacket furnaces most commonly used a cold air blast, typically provided by a positive-displacement blower, such as a Roots blower. Preheating of the air blast was used on some water jacket furnaces, but preheating of the blast had no advantage when the furnace was being used for pyritic smelting of copper ore.

The horizontal cross-section of water jacket furnaces was usually rectangular—although circular and oval cross-section ones did exist—whereas conventional blast furnaces making iron always have a circular horizontal cross-section. In some larger furnace designs, molten metal / matte and molten slag were tapped at the opposite narrow ends of the rectangular base. Water jacket furnaces typically have a higher number of smaller tuyeres than a conventional iron-making blast furnace.

Typically, feedstock was fed into a water jacket furnace through a vertical sliding door arrangement in the side of the upper furnace structure, but not via the top itself as in a blast furnace for iron. At the top of a water jacket furnace was a fixed flue. The off-gas from copper smelting was not suitable to be recycled as a fuel, as is done in a blast furnace making iron (blast furnace gas). However, the sulphur dioxide in the flue gases, from those furnaces using the pyritic smelting process, was concentrated enough that it could be used to make sulphuric acid, which reduced the level of air pollution created by the smelter. If the flue gas needed to be dispersed to the atmosphere, a tall chimney was necessary. to ensure that the noxious gases from smelting, largely sulphur dioxide, were carried far from the smelter and any nearby settlement. Dust carried in the flue gas was often collected, as it had a significant metallic content. A furnace smelting lead uses a reduction reaction; it generates an off-gas containing carbon monoxide, similar to blast furnace gas, which needs to be disposed of, usually by flaring.

In contrast to a conventional blast furnace used to make iron, lead metal or copper matte and slag were run off more or less continuously. There was a separate slag spout to run off slag. The molten copper matte run from such a furnace, under this arrangement, still contained a proportion of slag. The copper matte was run first into a vessel known as a 'settler' to allow any residual slag to accumulate on the surface, from where it could overflow from the settler. From tap holes at the bottom of the settler, the molten matte was run into ladles, which were used to transport the matte to a convertor, where it was processed to make blister copper. The 'settler' presented a hazard to furnace operators.

=== Other applications ===
==== Zinc smelting ====
A variant of the water jacket furnace was used to smelt lead-zinc ores using the Imperial Smelting Process. In that case, the furnace was completely sealed, to allow the zinc to be recovered, from flue gases, in its vapour phase.

==== Copper slag reprocessing ====
Water jacket furnaces were used to reprocess copper smelter slag that still contained a significant amount of copper, especially slag from smelting high-grade copper ore in reverberatory furnaces.

==== Gold ores ====
Although rarely done, small water jacket furnaces have been used to recover gold from quartz rock—particularly if the ore was very rich in gold or sulphide ores of other metals were also present—as an alternative to crushing the rock and extracting the gold using other methods. However, it was a relatively inefficient method of extracting gold.

Where gold and silver were present in copper ores, the precious metals were present in the copper matte produced by a water jacket furnace. The precious metals could later be separated from blister copper, using electrolytic copper refining, and delivered in the form of dore bullion.

== Demise (copper smelting) ==
Decline in copper ore grades

As the average ore grades of copper mines declined, ore smelting became uneconomic. Smelters such as the Great Cobar mine were struggling to achieve economic operation, as early as 1912, despite buoyant copper prices.

Smelting of low-grade copper ore at the mine site was largely superseded by a process consisting of copper ore concentration, especially using froth flotation, and smelting of ore concentrates. The water jacket furnace was less well suited to that new regime—especially large ones that had been used to smelt low grade copper ores—and, after the introduction of flash smelting, from around 1949, had fallen out of favour by 1980.

== Modern lead smelting ==
Water jacket furnaces are now a largely forgotten technology for copper smelting, but remain in use, in a modified form, for lead smelting. Modern lead furnaces are more commonly referred to as lead blast furnaces, but retain most features of water jacket furnaces.

== Gallery ==
Water jacket furnaces used for smelting copper ore

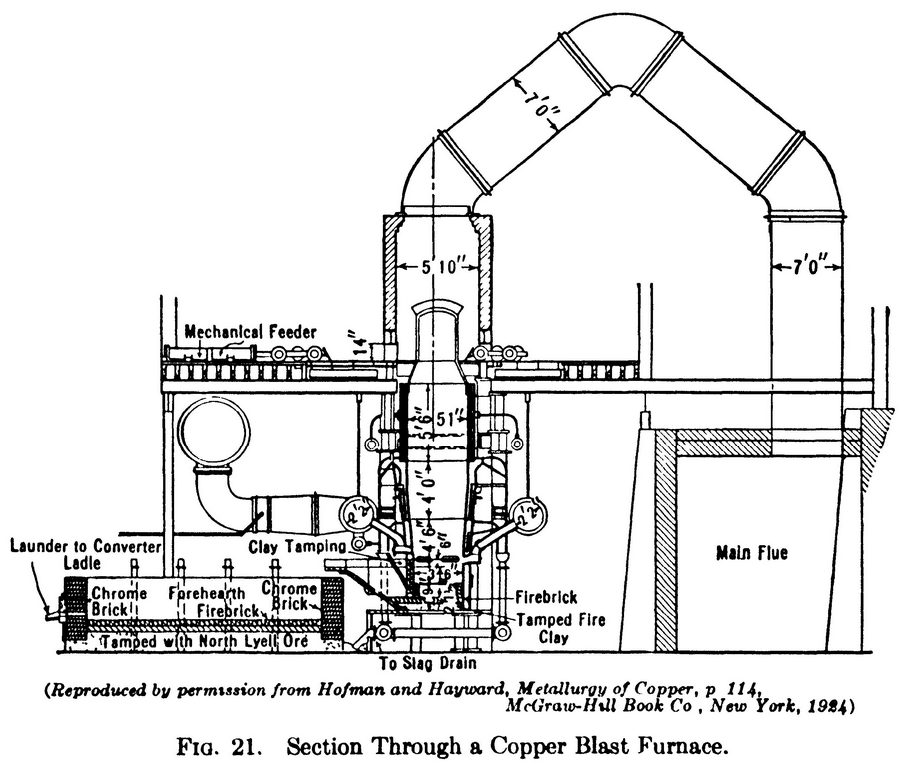
Section through a water jacket furnace, most likely one at Mount Lyell in Tasmania. At bottom left is the 'settler'.

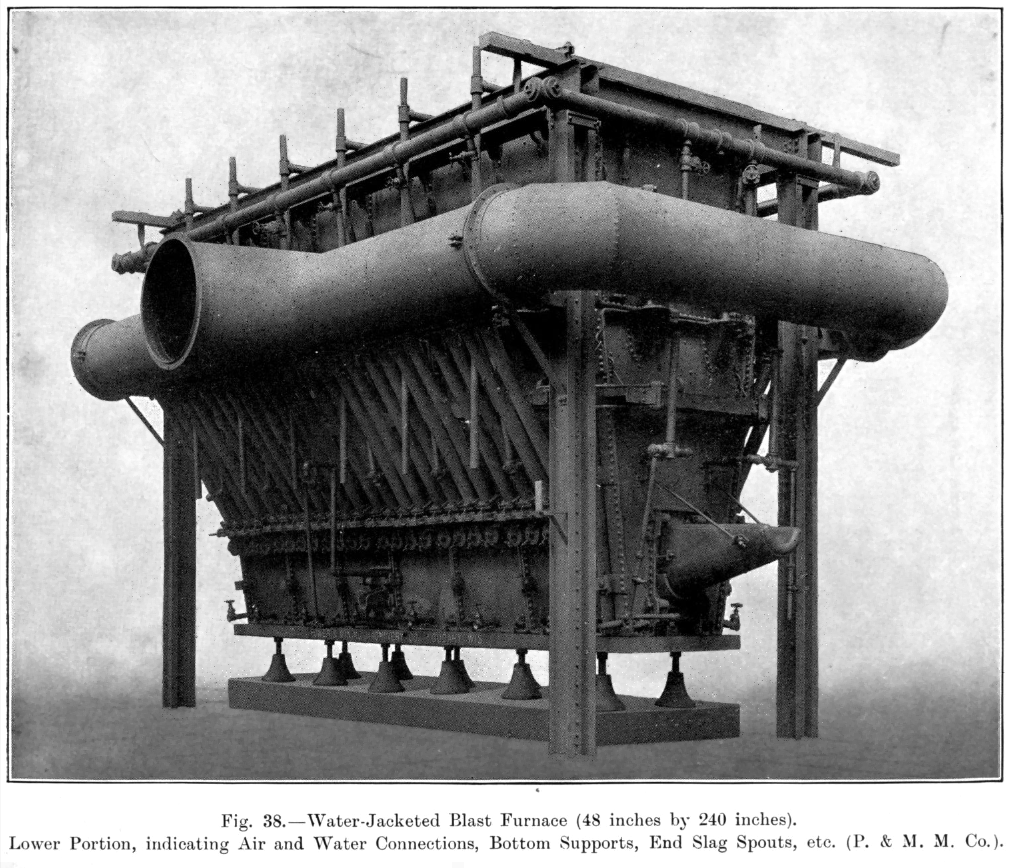
Lower part of a water jacket furnace used to smelt copper ore

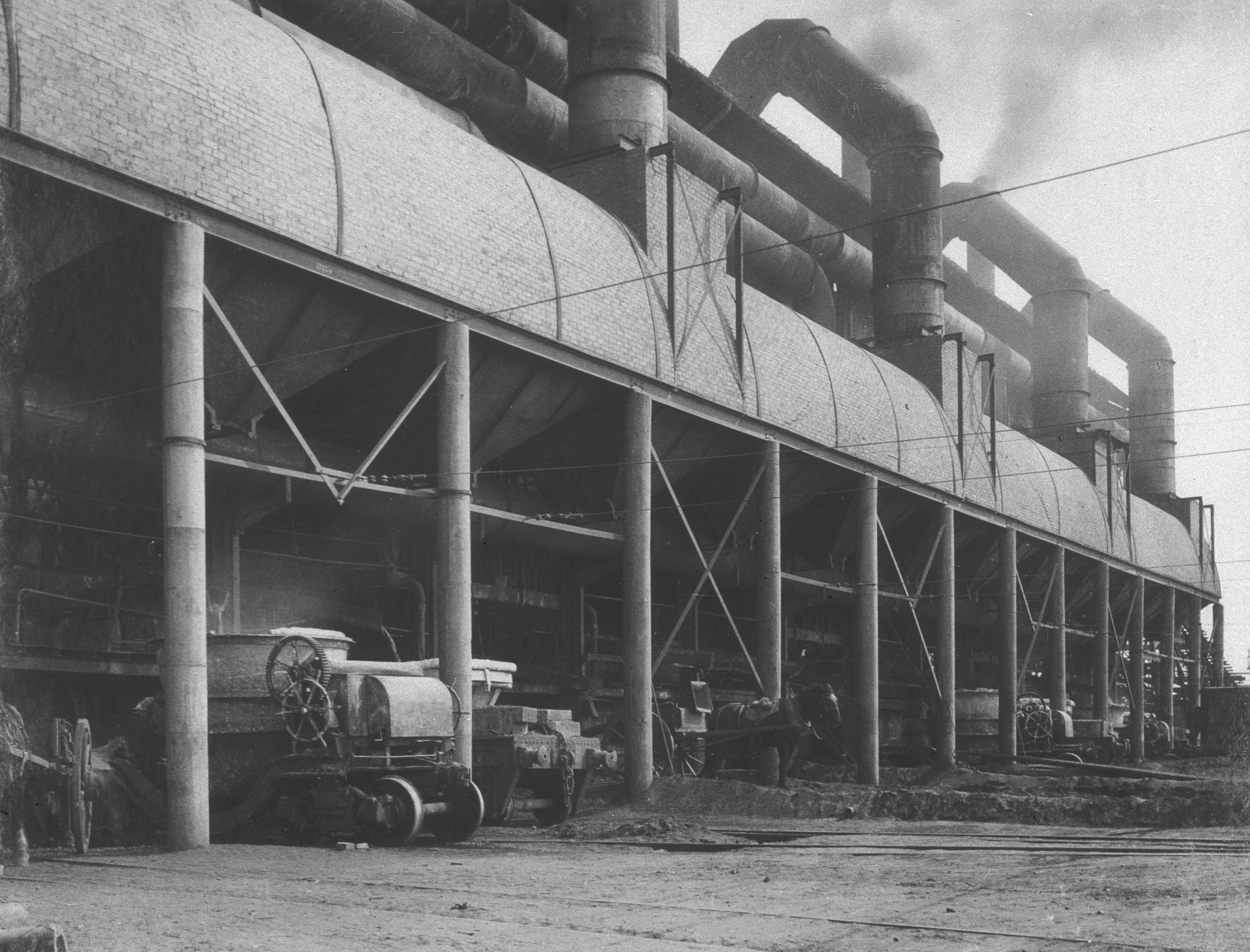
Great Cobar mine - Water jacket furnaces, from outside the smelter building, showing furnace flues to main flue, and slag wagons (1912)

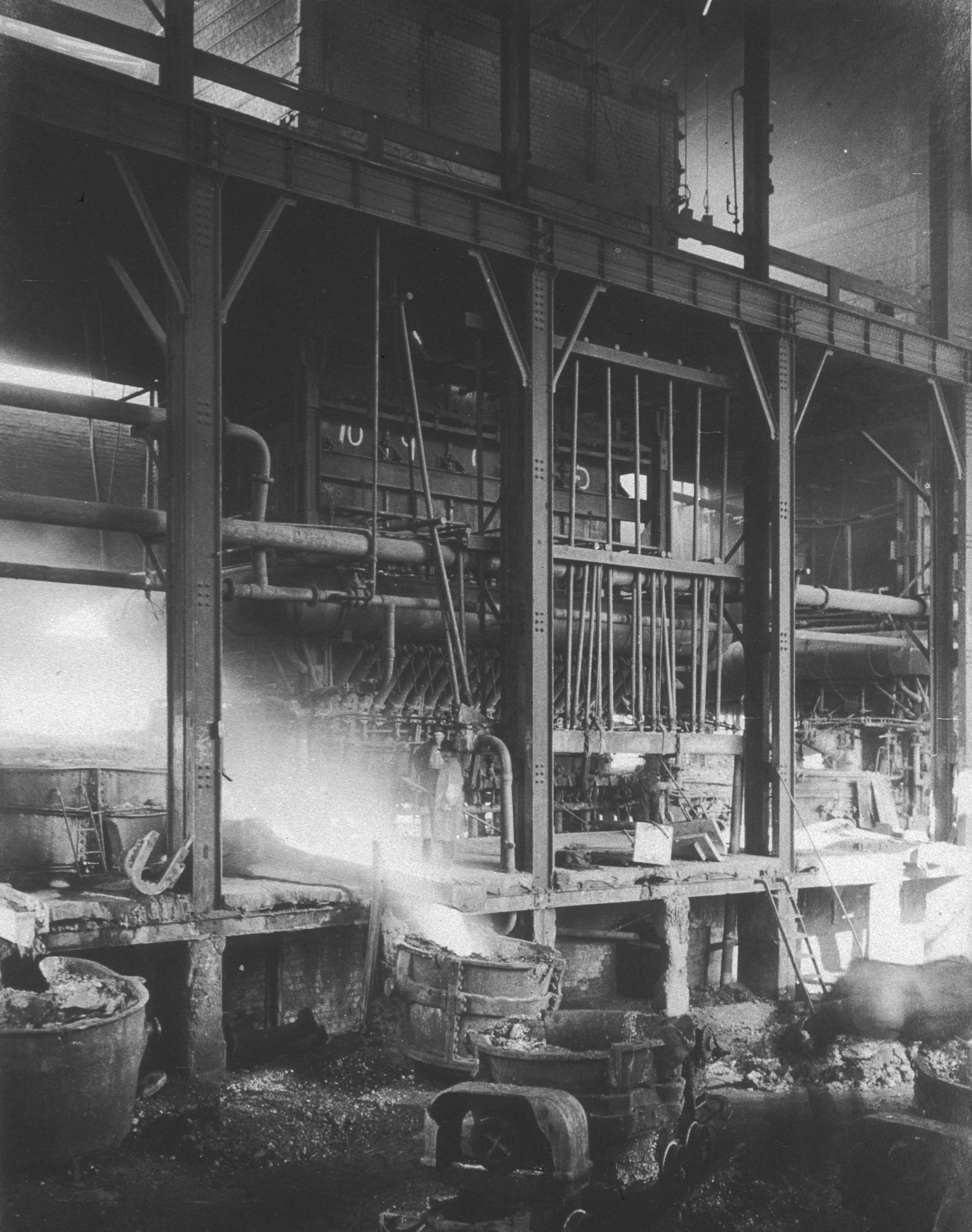
Great Cobar mine - Pouring molten copper matte from a water jacket furnace, viewed from inside the smelter building (June 1912)

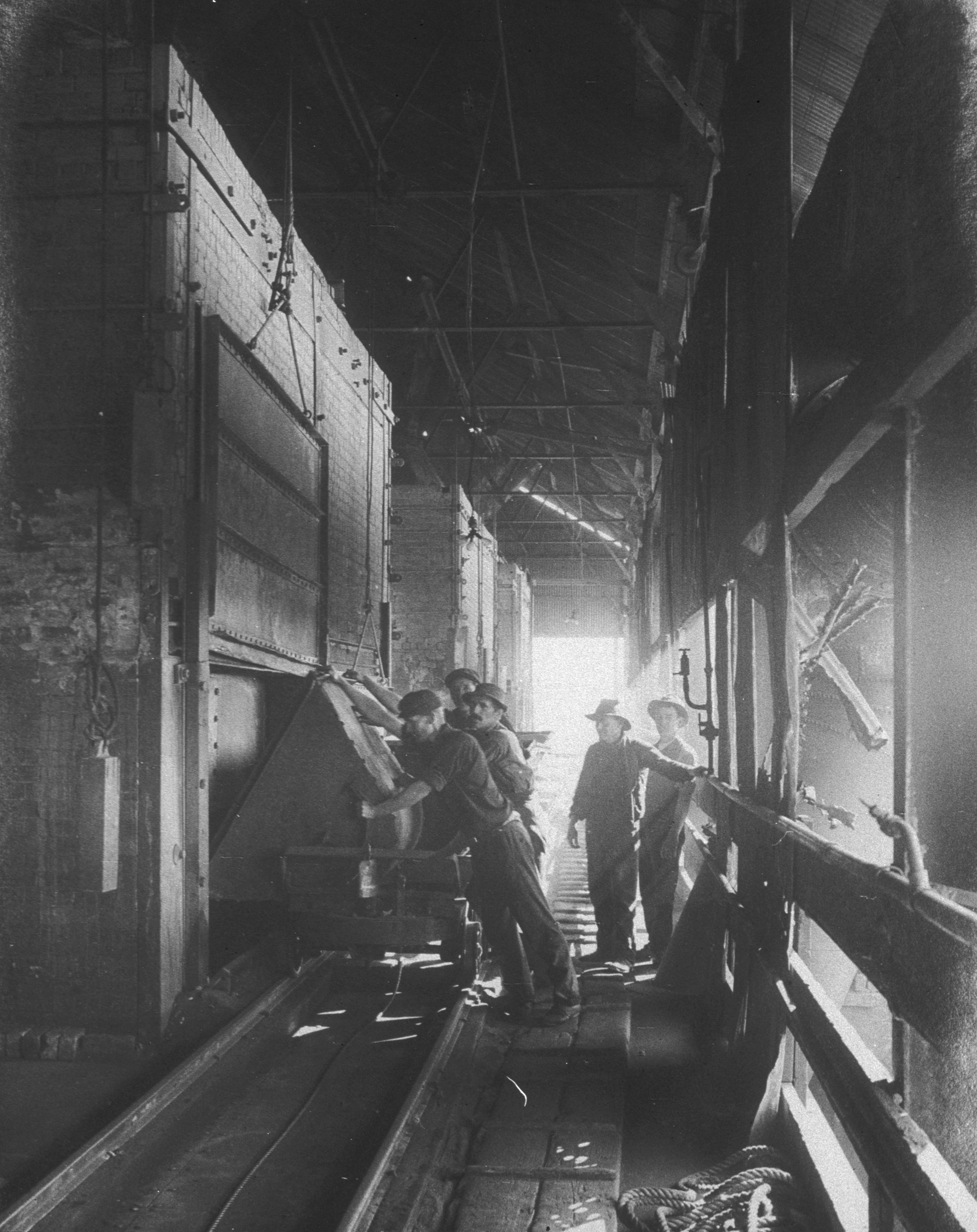
Great Cobar mine, feeding floor of furnaces (1912)

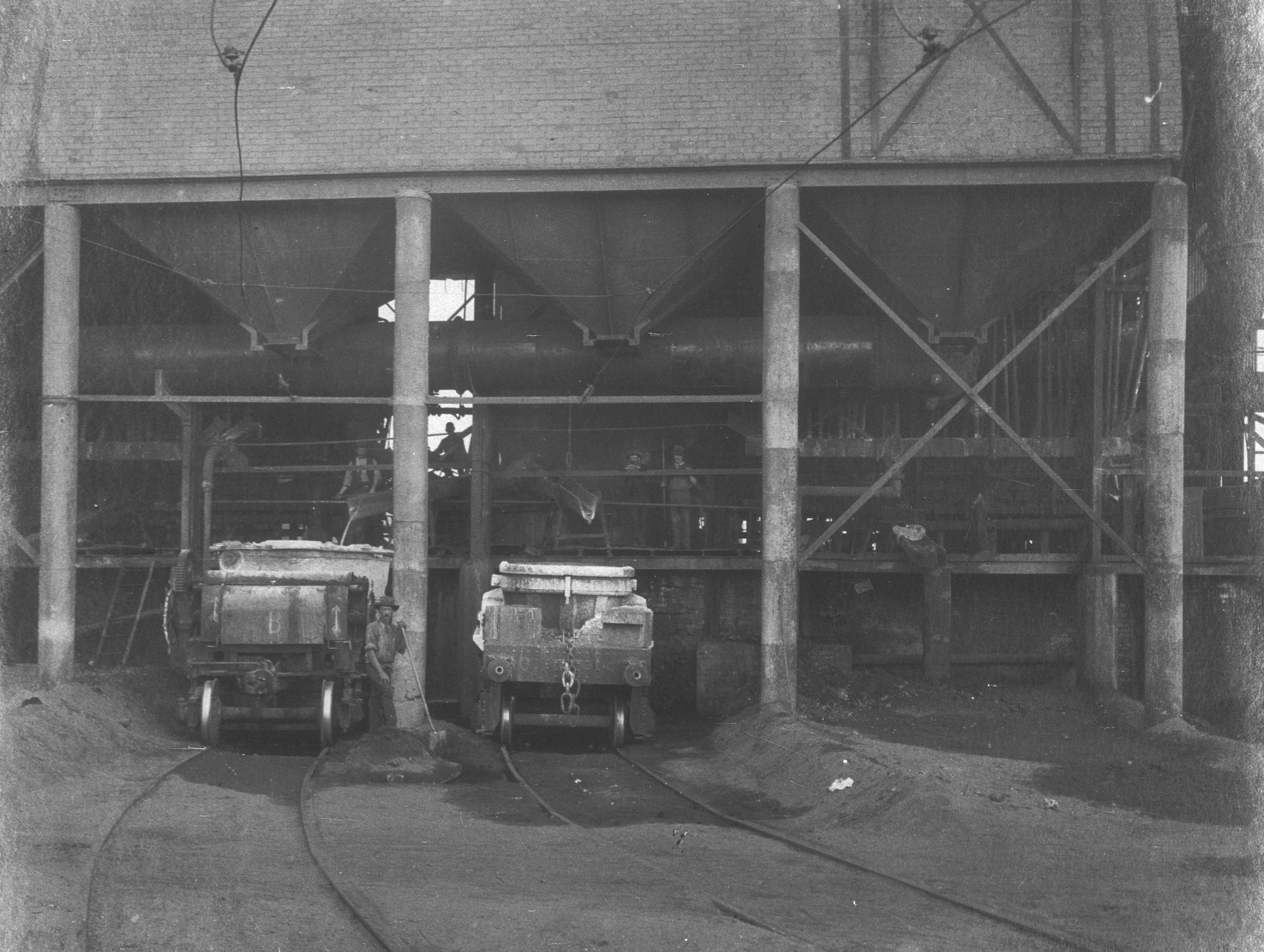
Great Cobar mine, slag runoff into ladle wagons (1912). The flue dust collection hoppers are visible below the brickwork.

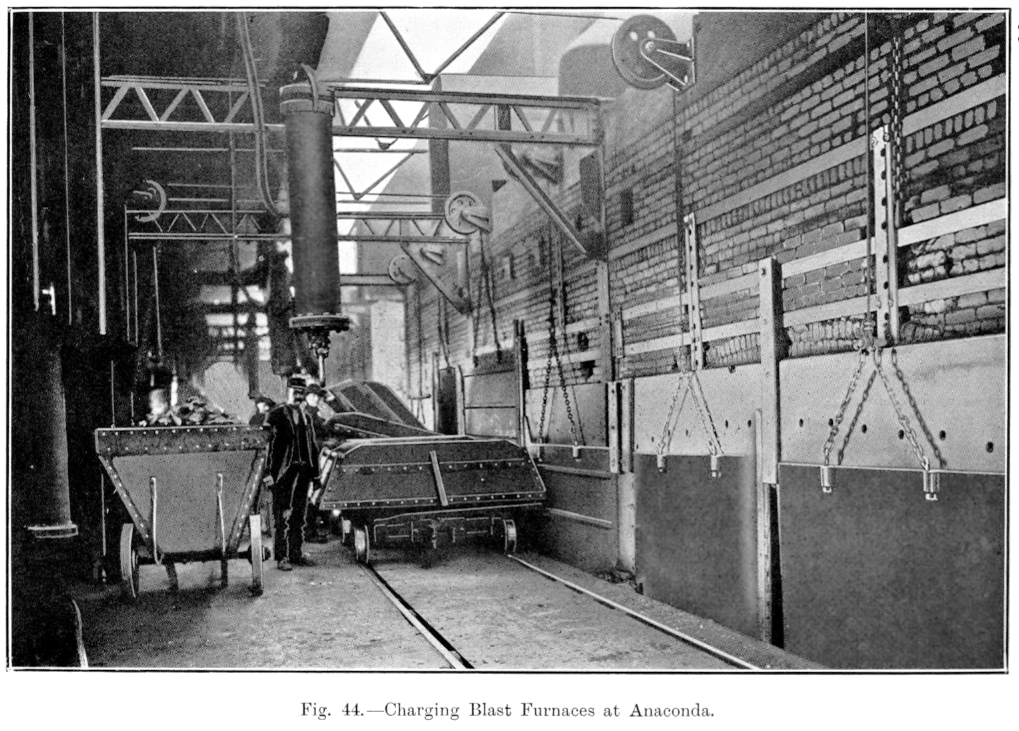
Anaconda Copper, Montana, charging equipment at the upper level of furnaces (c.1912)

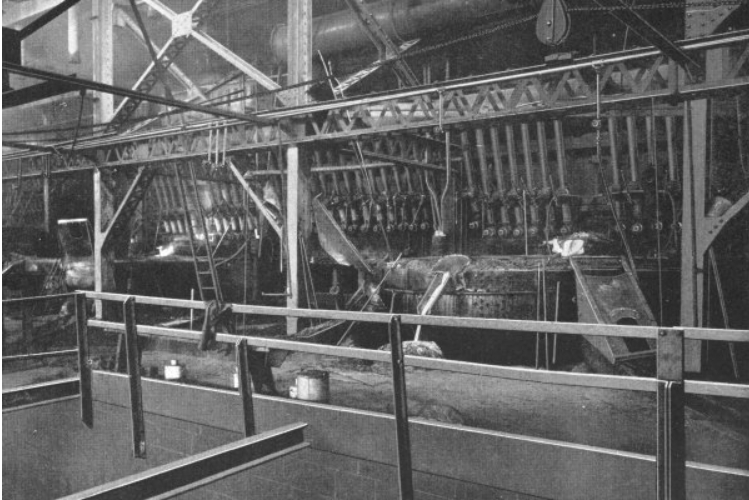
Anaconda Copper, water jacket furnaces showing settlers (c.1912)

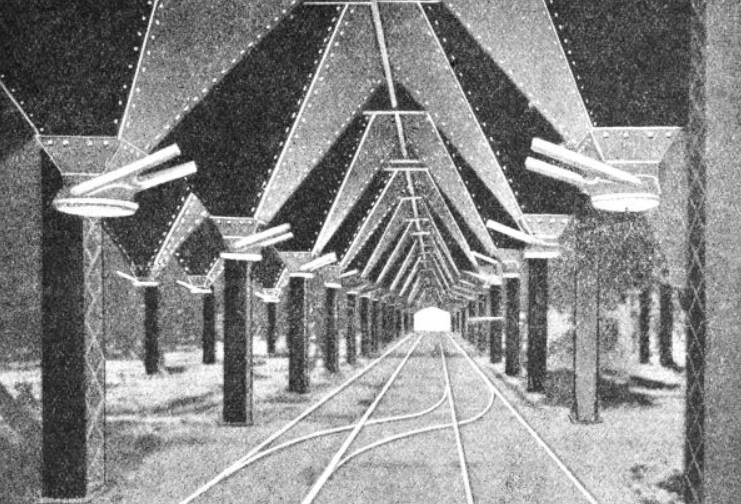
Anaconda Copper - Flue dust hoppers and tracks underneath (c.1912)

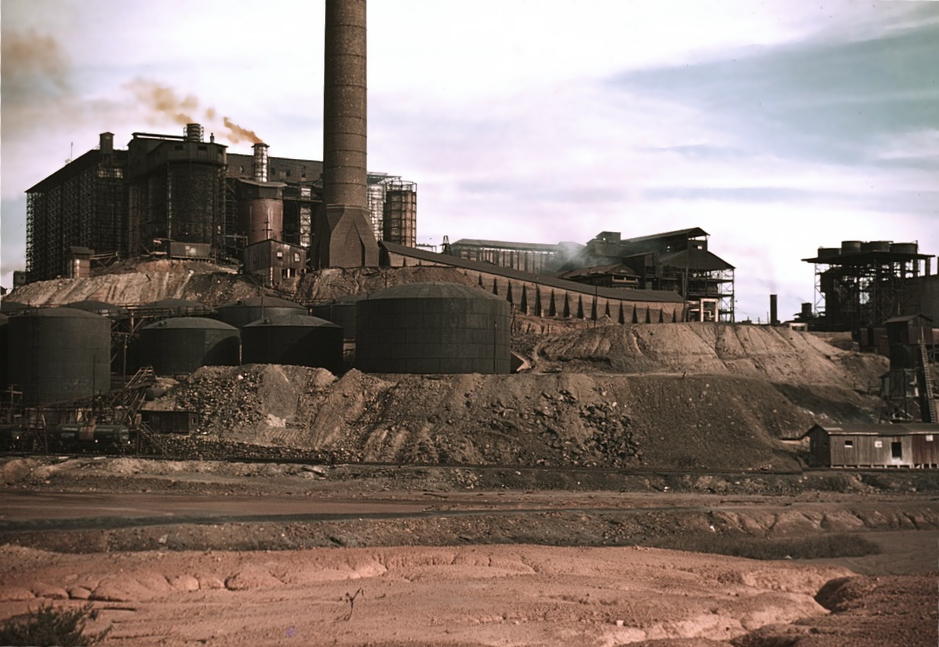
Smelter and sulphuric acid plant, Copperhill, Tennessee, 1939.

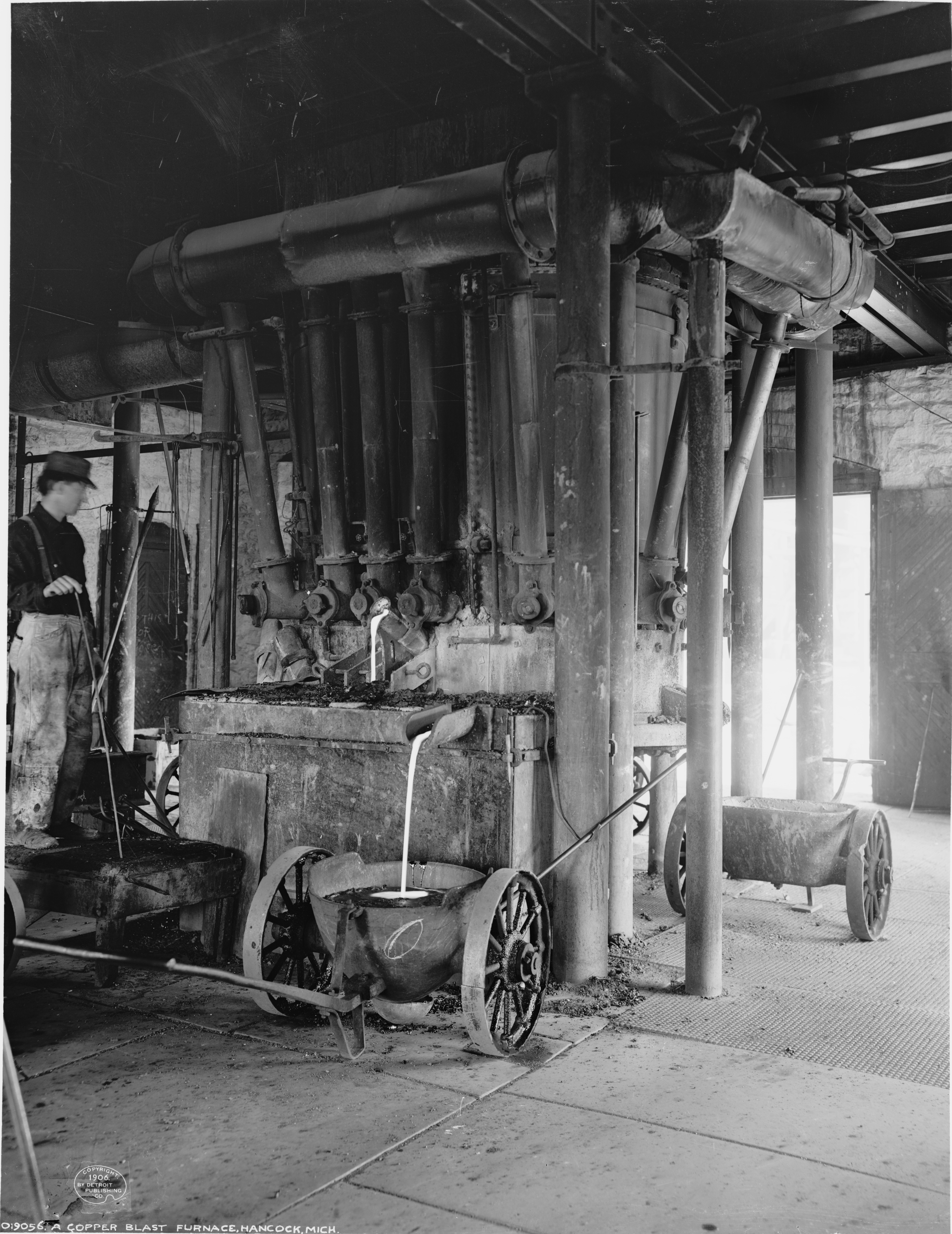
Small water jacket furnace for copper smelting, Hancock, Michigan, c.1906

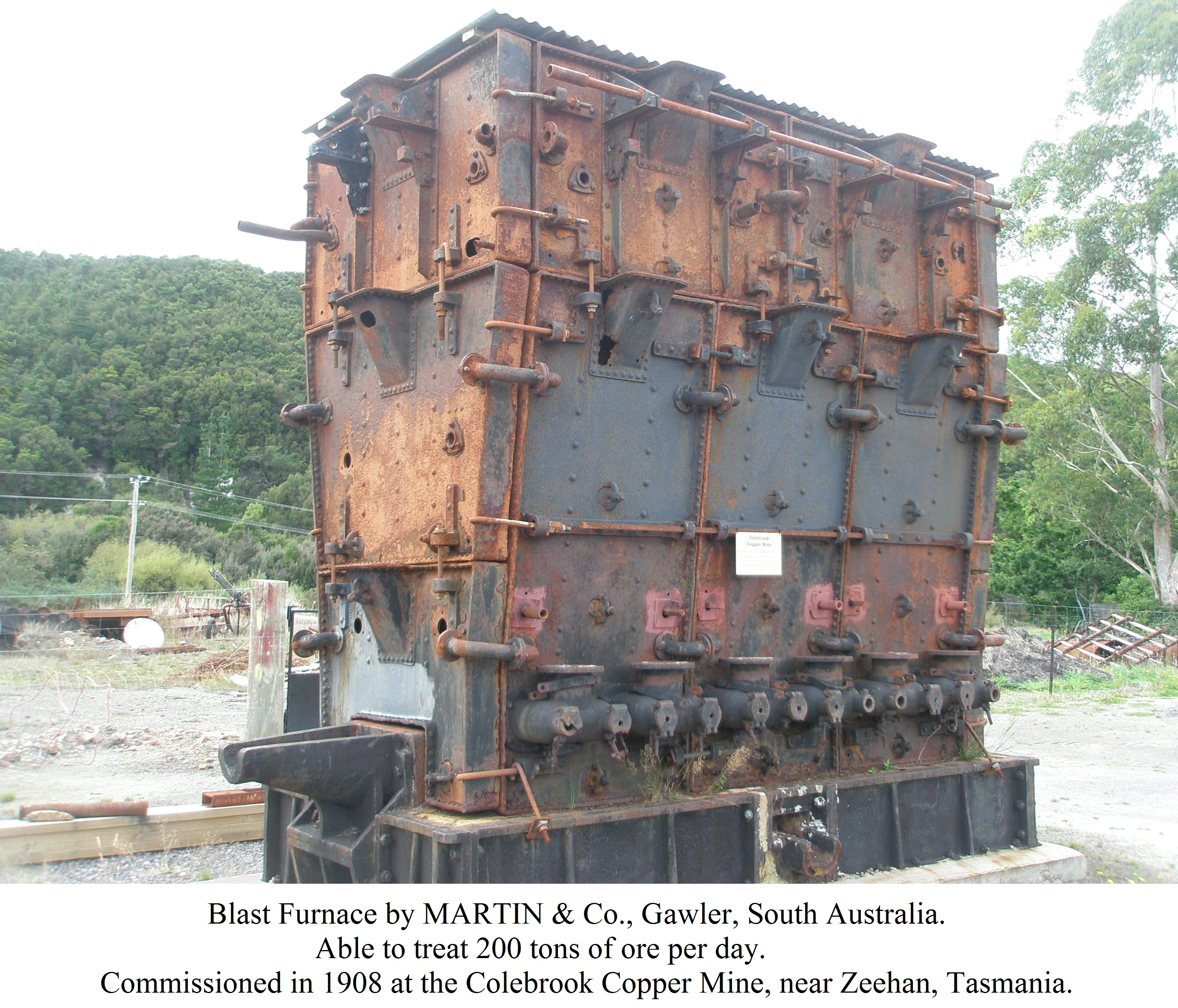
Surviving lower portion of a water jacket furnace, Zeehan, Tasmania. It was manufactured by James Martin & Co, and commissioned in 1908.
Water jacket furnaces used for smelting lead or lead-silver ore

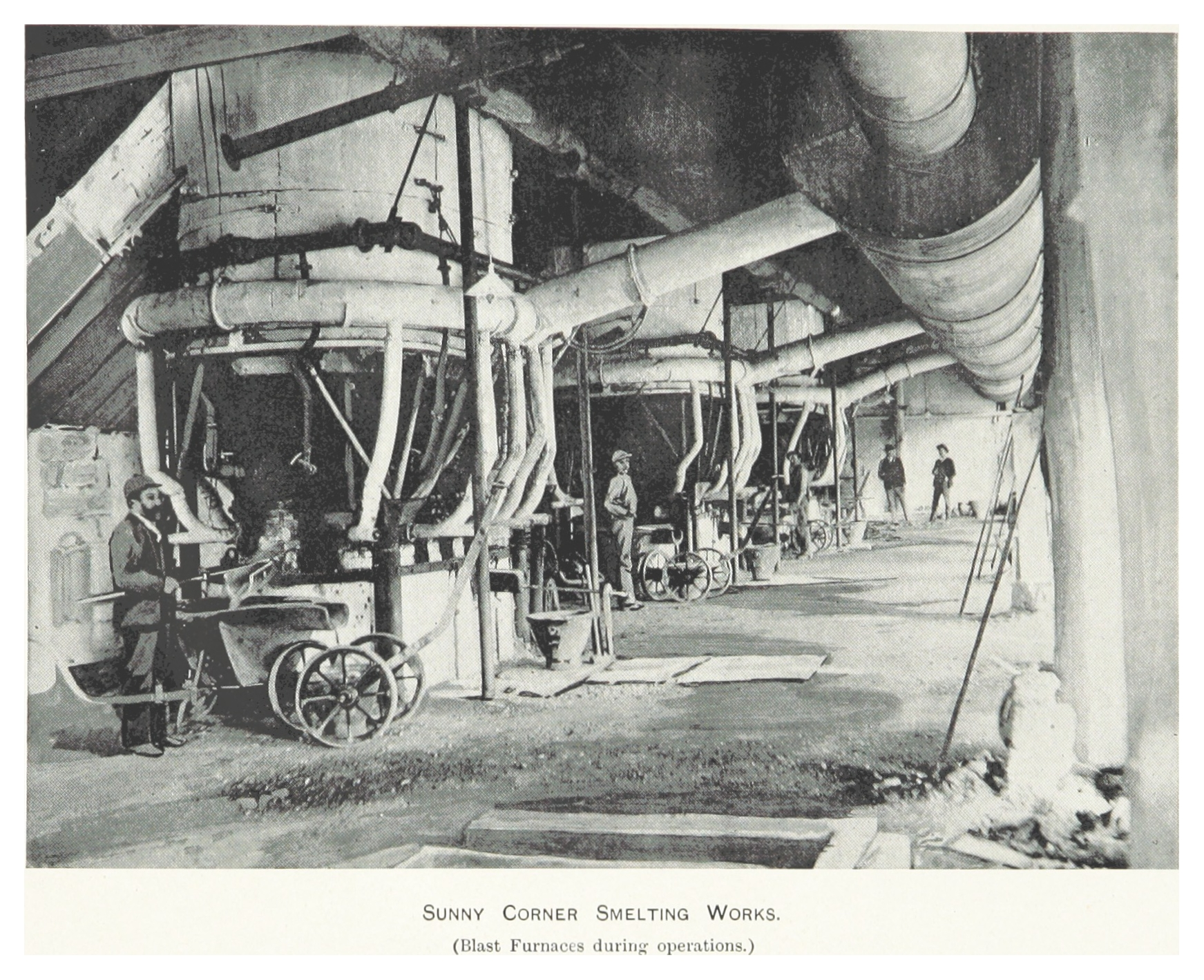
Sunny Corner, NSW, water jacket furnaces (c1899). This mine was primarily a silver mine.

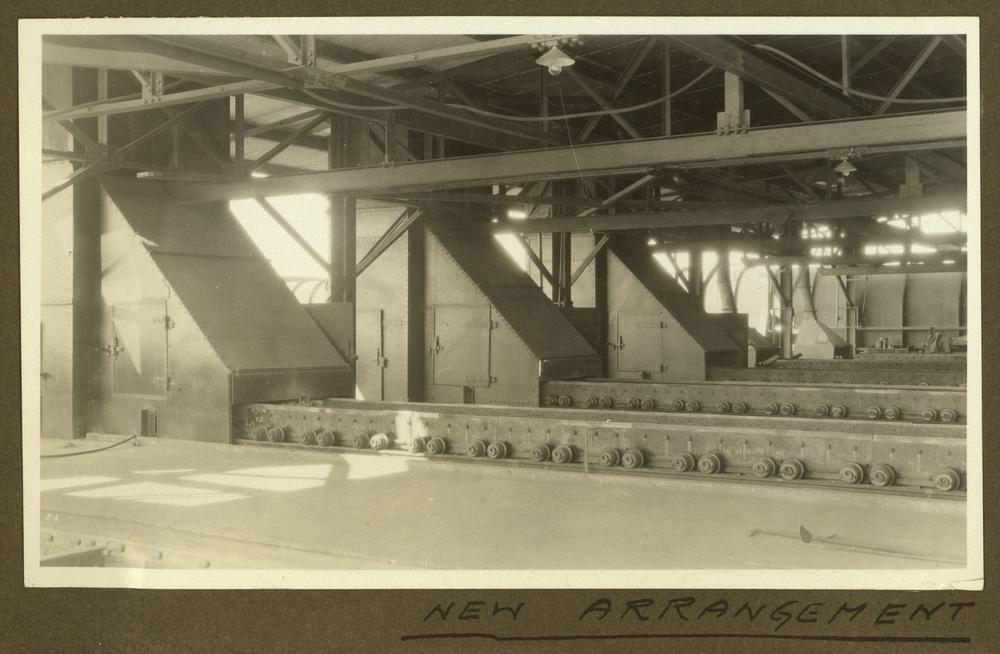
Mount Isa Mines, lead ore sintering machine, 1932, used to convert sulphide ores to oxides suitable for smelting in a water-jacket furnace

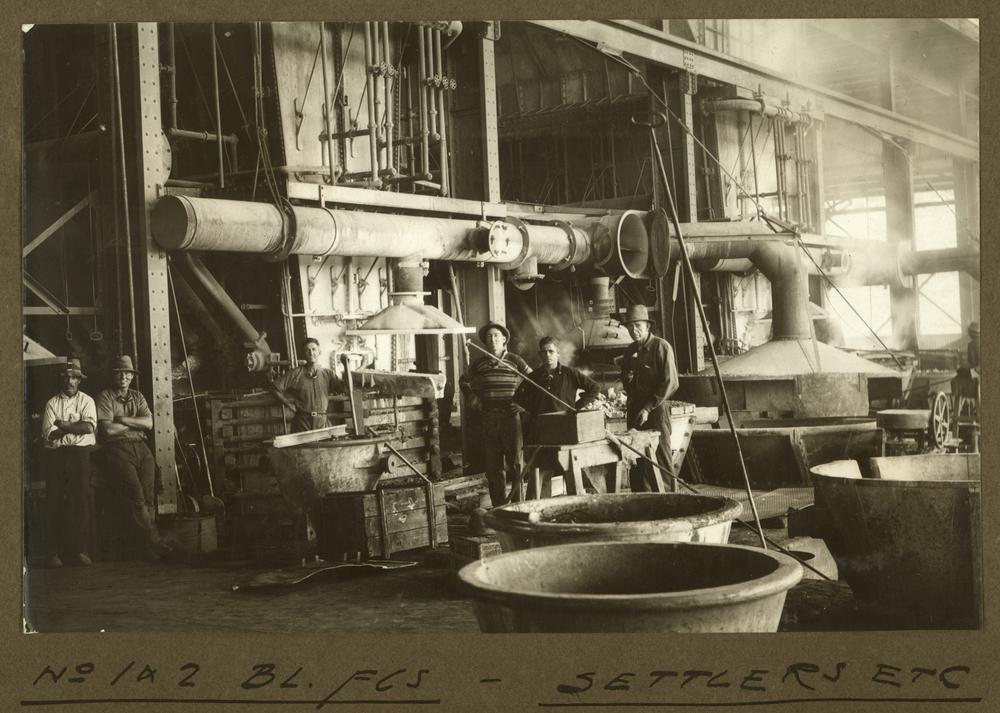
Mount Isa Mines, Furnaces 1 & 2, 1932, showing arrangements to remove lead vapour

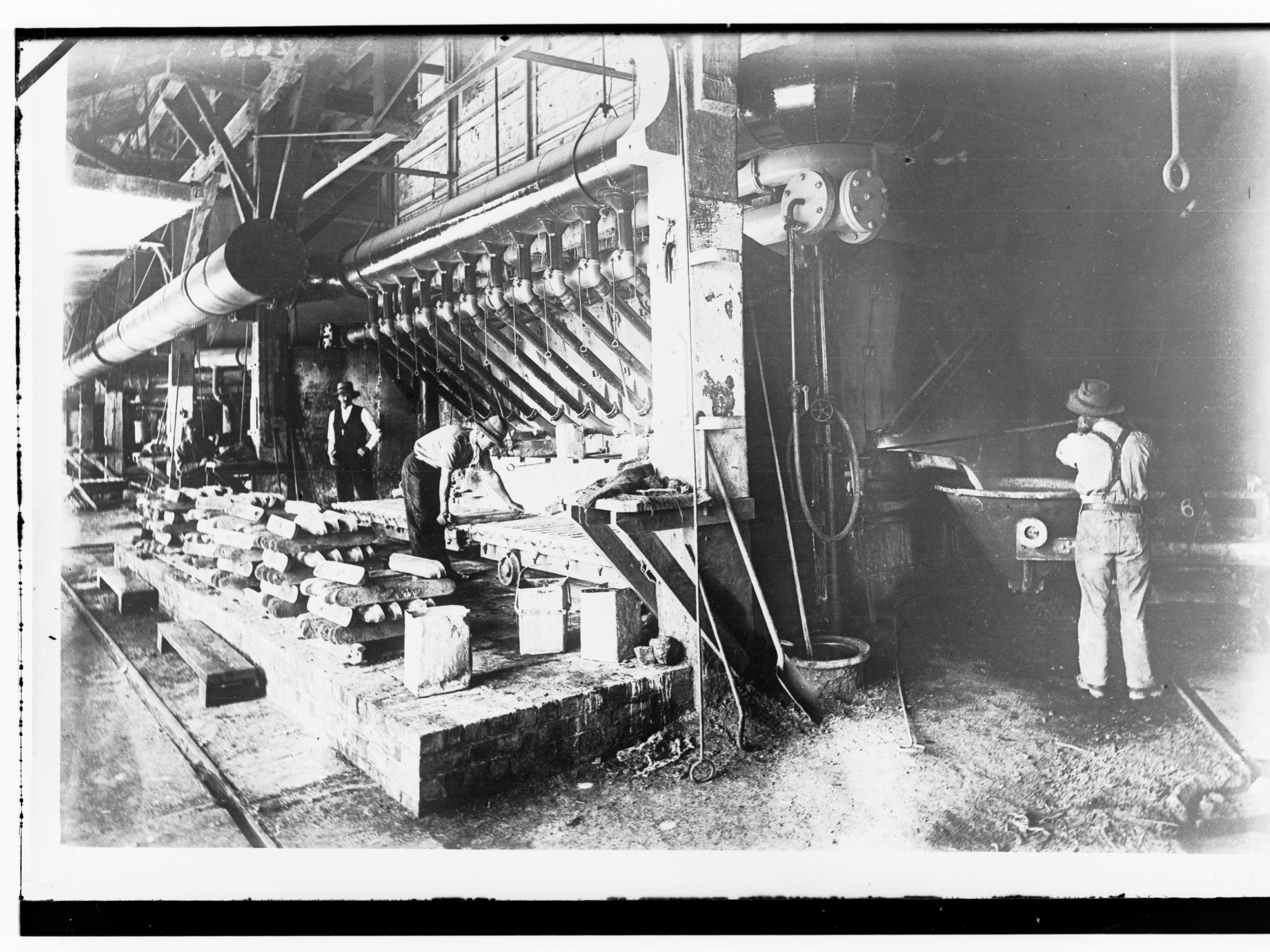
BHP, Port Pirie, water jacket furnace, c.1915. Metal ingots are being cast on left and slag run off on right. The slag wagon has two pivoting cantilevered slag ladles.

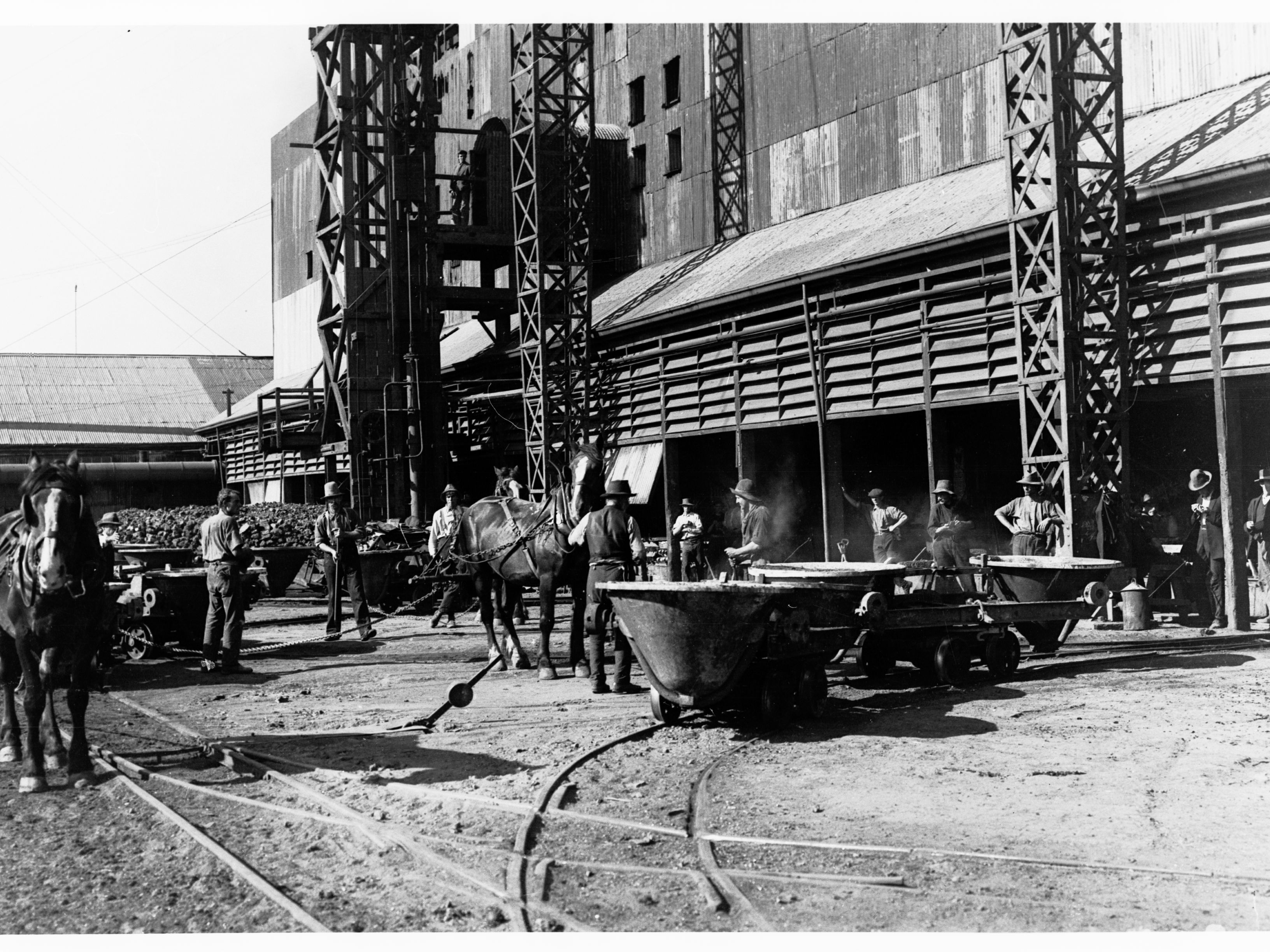
BHP, Port Pirie, Slag pots outside smelter building, c.1915

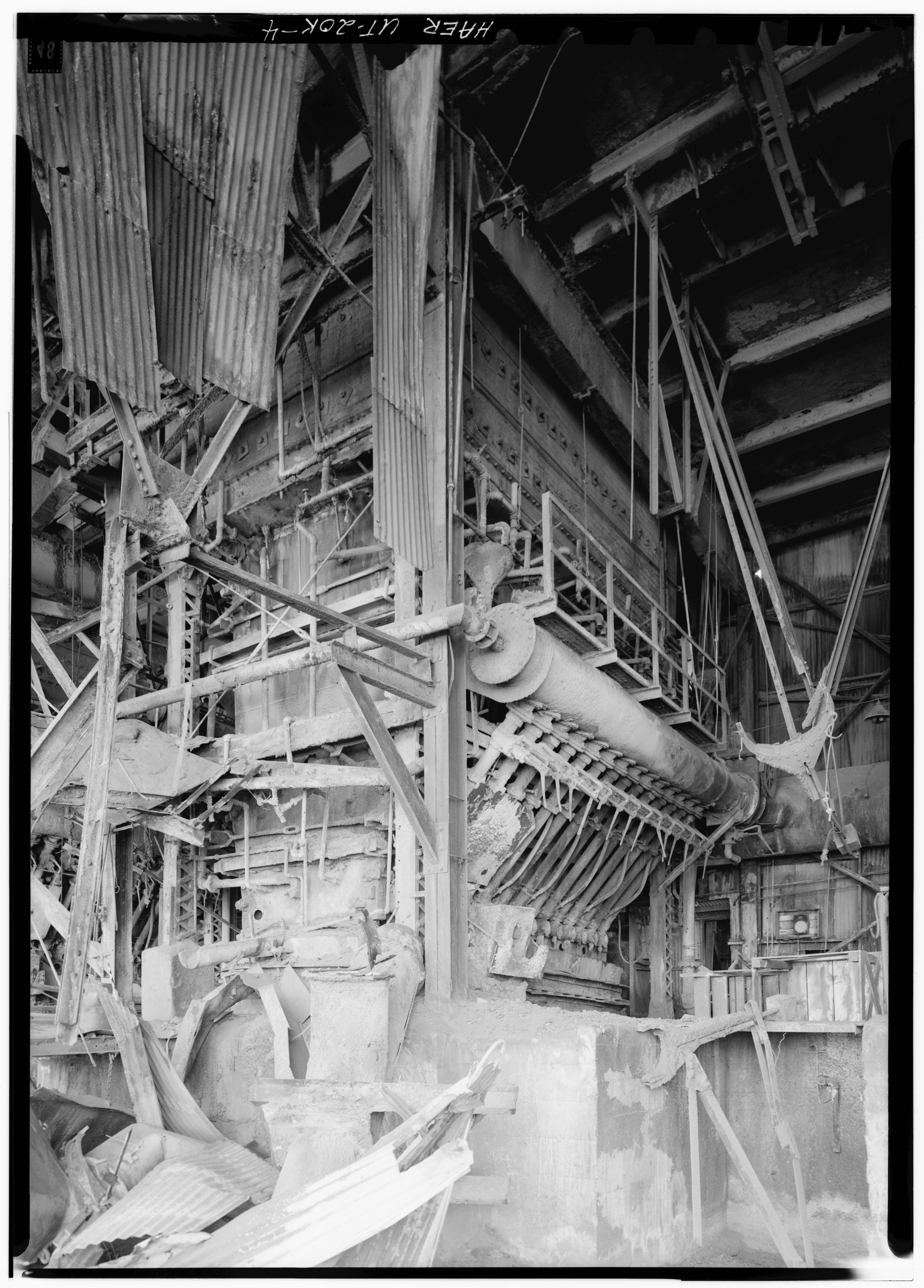
International Smelting and Refining Company (Toole Smelter), Utah, water jacket furnace for lead

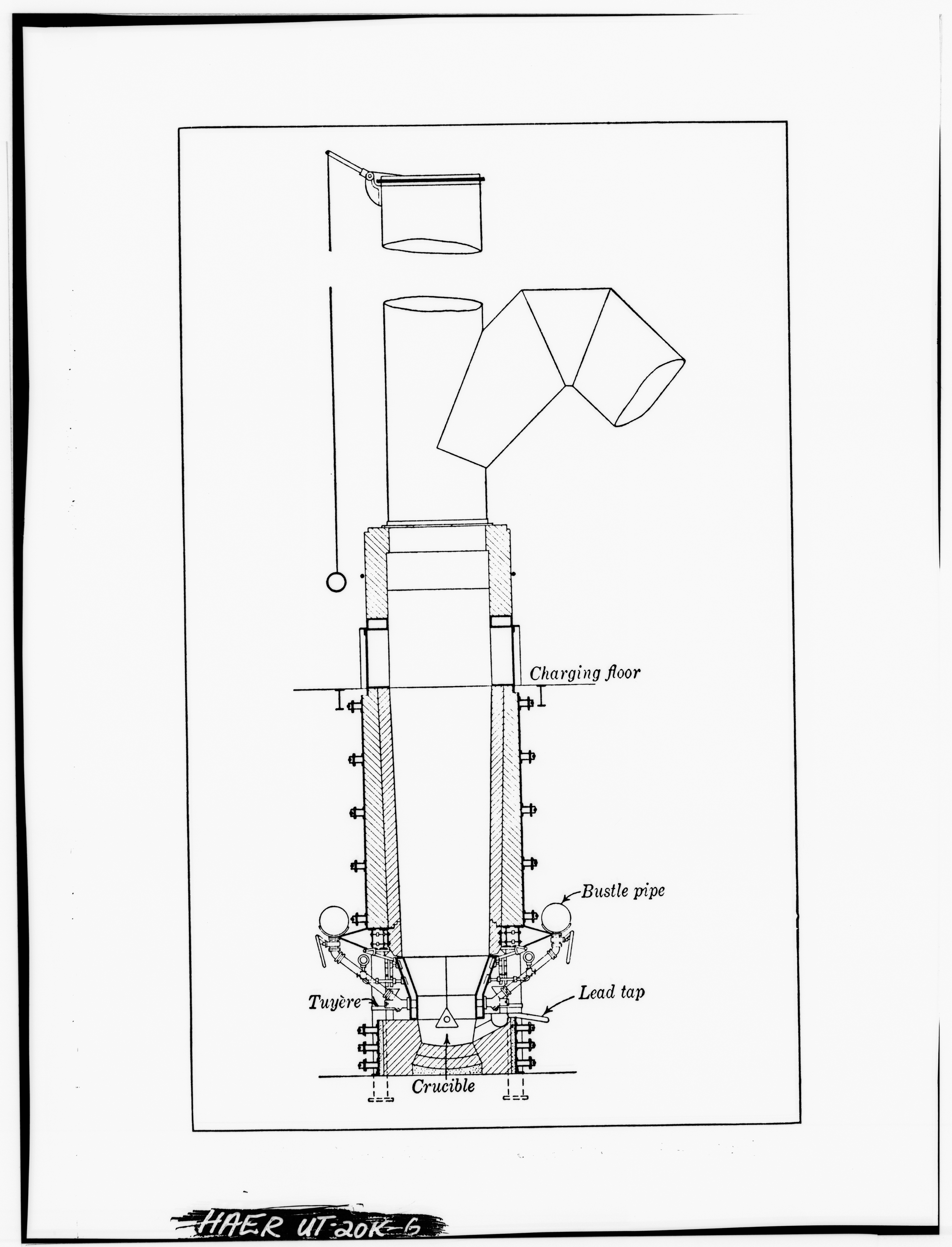
International Smelting and Refining Company, Toole - Cross-section of water jacket furnace (1929)

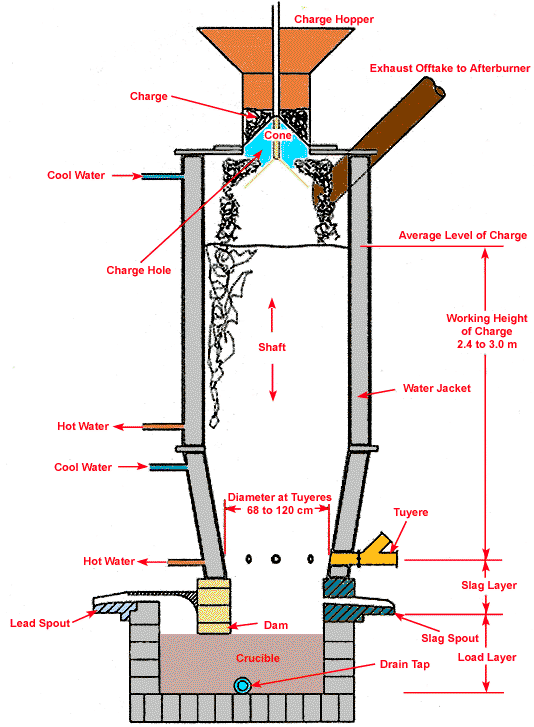
Cross-section of modern lead blast furnace. Charging is via a bell top.

== See also ==
- Blast furnace
- Reverberatory furnace
- Flash smelting
- ISASMELT
