= Pyrometallurgy =

Branch of extractible metallurgy

Pyrometallurgy is a branch of extractive metallurgy. It consists of the thermal treatment of minerals and metallurgical ores and concentrates to bring about physical and chemical transformations in the materials to enable recovery of valuable metals. Pyrometallurgical treatment may produce products able to be sold such as pure metals, or intermediate compounds or alloys, suitable as feed for further processing. Examples of elements extracted by pyrometallurgical processes include the oxides of less reactive elements like iron, copper, zinc, chromium, tin, and manganese.

Pyrometallurgical processes are generally grouped into one or more of the following categories:

- calcining,
- roasting,
- smelting,
- refining.

Most pyrometallurgical processes require energy input to sustain the temperature at which the process takes place. The energy is usually provided in the form of combustion or from electrical heat. When sufficient material is present in the feed to sustain the process temperature solely by exothermic reaction (i.e. without the addition of fuel or electrical heat), the process is said to be "autogenous". Processing of some sulfide ores exploit the exothermicity of their combustion.

== Calcination ==
Calcination is thermal decomposition of a material. Examples include decomposition of hydrates such as ferric hydroxide to ferric oxide and water vapor, the decomposition of calcium carbonate to calcium oxide and carbon dioxide as well as iron carbonate to iron oxide:

CaCO_{3} → CaO + CO_{2}

Calcination processes are carried out in a variety of furnaces, including shaft furnaces, rotary kilns, and fluidized bed reactors.

== Roasting ==
Roasting consists of thermal gas–solid reactions, which can include oxidation, reduction, chlorination, sulfation, and pyrohydrolysis.

The most common example of roasting is the oxidation of metal sulfide ores. The metal sulfide is heated in the presence of air to a temperature that allows the oxygen in the air to react with the sulfide to form sulfur dioxide gas and solid metal oxide. The solid product from roasting is often called "calcine". In oxidizing roasting, if the temperature and gas conditions are such that the sulfide feed is completely oxidized, the process is known as "dead roasting". Sometimes, as in the case of pre-treating reverberatory or electric smelting furnace feed, the roasting process is performed with less than the required amount of oxygen to fully oxidize the feed. In this case, the process is called "partial roasting" because the sulfur is only partially removed. Finally, if the temperature and gas conditions are controlled such that the sulfides in the feed react to form metal sulfates instead of metal oxides, the process is known as "sulfation roasting". Sometimes, temperature and gas conditions can be maintained such that a mixed sulfide feed (for instance a feed containing both copper sulfide and iron sulfide) reacts such that one metal forms a sulfate and the other forms an oxide, the process is known as "selective roasting" or "selective sulfation".

== Smelting ==
Smelting involves thermal reactions in which at least one product is a molten phase. Metal oxides can then be smelted by heating with coke or charcoal (forms of carbon), a reducing agent that liberates the oxygen as carbon dioxide leaving a refined mineral. Concern about the production of carbon dioxide is only a recent worry, following the identification of the enhanced greenhouse effect.

Carbonate ores are also smelted with charcoal, but sometimes need to be calcined first. Other materials may need to be added as flux, aiding the melting of the oxide ores and assisting in the formation of a slag, as the flux reacts with impurities, such as silicon compounds. Smelting usually takes place at a temperature above the melting point of the metal, but processes vary considerably according to the ore involved and other matters.

== Refining ==
Refining is the removal of impurities from materials by a thermal process. This covers a wide range of processes, involving different kinds of furnace or other plant.

The term "refining" can also refer to certain electrolytic processes. Accordingly, some kinds of pyrometallurgical refining are referred to as "fire refining".

== See also ==
- Blast furnace
- Flash smelting
- Isasmelt furnace
- Reverberatory furnace
