= ISASMELT =

Smelting process

The installed feed capacity of Isasmelt furnaces has grown as the technology has been accepted in smelters around the world.

The ISASMELT process is an energy-efficient smelting process that was jointly developed from the 1970s to the 1990s by Mount Isa Mines (a subsidiary of MIM Holdings and now part of Glencore) and the Government of Australia's CSIRO. It has relatively low capital and operating costs for a smelting process.

ISASMELT technology has been applied to lead, copper, and nickel smelting. As of 2021, 22 plants were in operation in eleven countries, along with three demonstration plants located at Mt Isa. The installed capacity of copper/nickel operating plants in 2020 was 9.76 million tonnes per year of feed materials and 750 thousand tonnes per year across lead operating plants.

Smelters based on the copper ISASMELT process are among the lowest-cost copper smelters in the world.

== The ISASMELT furnace ==
An ISASMELT furnace is an upright-cylindrical shaped steel vessel that is lined with refractory bricks. There is a molten bath of slag, matte or metal (depending on the application) at the bottom of the furnace. A steel lance is lowered into the bath through a hole in the roof of the furnace, and (possibly oxygen-enriched) air is injected through the lance, causing vigorous agitation of the bath.

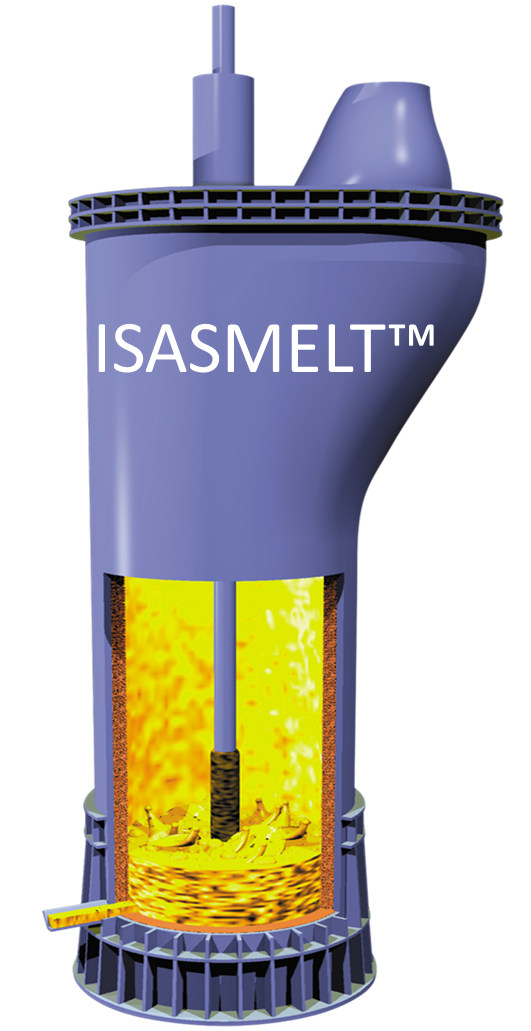
Cut-away view of an Isasmelt furnace

Mineral concentrates or materials for recycling are dropped into the bath through another hole in the furnace roof or, in some cases, injected down the lance. These feed materials react with the oxygen in the injected gas, resulting in an intensive reaction in a small volume (relative to other smelting technologies).

ISASMELT lances contain one or more devices called "swirlers" that cause the injected gas to spin within the lance, forcing it against the lance wall, cooling it. The swirler consists of curved vanes around a central pipe forming an annular flow. They are designed to minimize pressure losses changing the angle from axial to tangential thus creating a strong vortex. The vortex helps mix liquids and solids with oxygen in the bath. The cooling effect results in a layer of slag "freezing" on the outside of the lance. This layer of solid slag protects the lance from the high temperatures inside the furnace. The tip of the lance that is submerged in the bath eventually wears out, and the worn lance is easily replaced with a new one when necessary. The worn tips are subsequently cut off and a new tip welded onto the lance body before it is returned to the furnace.

ISASMELT furnaces typically operate in the range of 1000–1200 °C, depending on the application. The refractory bricks that form the internal lining of the furnace protect the steel shell from the heat inside the furnace.

The products are removed from the furnace through one or more "tap holes" in a process called "tapping". This can be either continuous removal or in batches, with the tap holes being blocked with clay at the end of a tap, and then reopened by drilling or with a thermic lance when it is time for the next tap.

The products are allowed to separate in a settling vessel, such as a rotary holding furnace or an electric furnace.

While smelting sulfide concentrates, most of the energy needed to heat and melt the feed materials is derived from the reaction of oxygen with the sulfur and iron in the concentrate. However, a small amount of supplemental energy is required. ISASMELT furnaces can use a variety of fuels, including coal, coke, petroleum coke, oil and natural gas. The solid fuel can be added through the top of the furnace with the other feed materials, or it can be injected down the lance. Liquid and gaseous fuels are injected down the lance.

== Advantages of the ISASMELT process ==
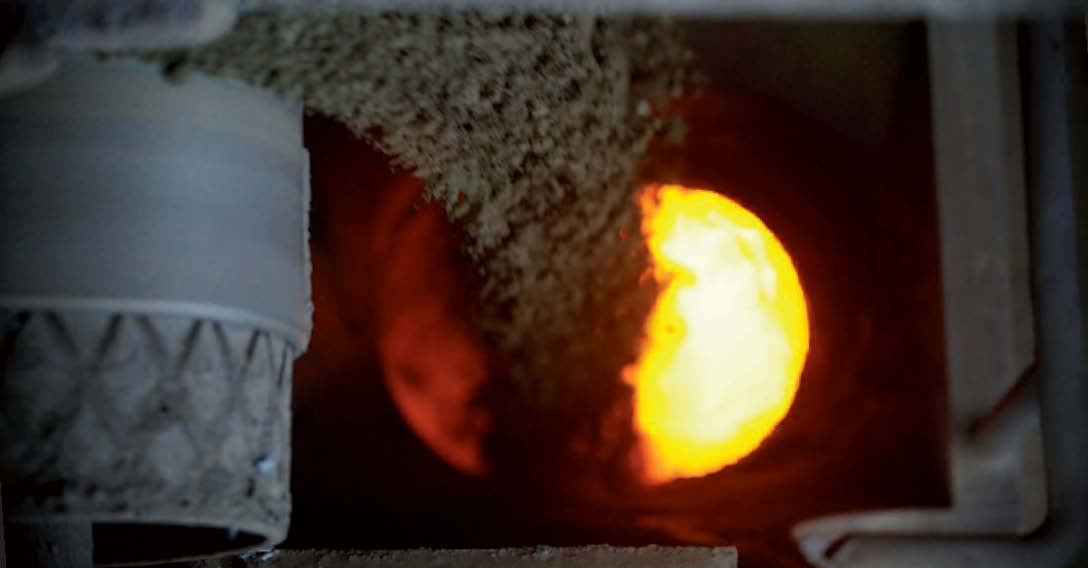
An ISASMELT furnace is typically fed with damp concentrate falling from a conveyor belt into the furnace.

The advantages of the ISASMELT process include:

- High productivity with a small footprint: Glencore's copper smelter in Mount Isa treats over 1 million t/y of copper concentrate through a single furnace 3.75 m in diameter. The small footprint makes the process well suited to retrofitting to existing smelters where there are significant space constraints
- Simple operation: the ISASMELT furnace does not require extensive feed preparation as the feed can be discharged from a belt conveyor directly into the furnace
- high energy efficiency: installing an ISASMELT furnace in the Mount Isa copper smelter reduced energy consumption by over 80% (through better use of the inherent energy contained in the sulfide concentrate) compared with the roaster and reverberatory furnaces previously used there
- Flexibility in feed types: ISASMELT furnaces have been used to smelt copper, lead and nickel concentrates with a wide range of compositions, including high levels of magnetite, and secondary materials, such as copper scrap and lead-acid battery paste
- Flexibility in fuel types: ISASMELT furnaces can operate with a variety of fuels, including lump coal of varying ranks, coke (lump or fine), petroleum coke, oil (including recycled oil), natural gas, and liquid petroleum gas, depending on which is the most economic at the smelter's location
- High turn-down ratio: the feed rate to a single ISASMELT installation can easily be scaled up or down, depending on the availability of concentrate and the needs of the smelter
- Low feed carry over: ISASMELT furnaces typically lose about 1% of the feed as carry-over with the waste gas, meaning less material needs to be returned to the furnace for retreatment
- Effective containment of fugitive emissions: because the furnace has only two openings at the top, any fugitive emissions can easily be captured
- High elimination of deleterious minor elements: due to the flushing action of the gases injected into the ISASMELT furnace slags, copper ISASMELT furnaces have a high elimination of minor elements, such as bismuth and arsenic, that can have deleterious effects on the properties of the product copper
- High sulfur dioxide concentration in the waste gas: the use of oxygen enrichment gives the ISASMELT plants high sulfur dioxide concentrations in the waste gas stream, making acid plants cheaper to build and operate
- Relatively low operating cost: the energy efficiency of the process, the simple feed preparation, the relative lack of moving parts, low feed carry-over rates, low labour requirements and the ease of replacing lances and refractory linings when they are worn give the ISASMELT process relatively low operating costs
- Relatively low capital cost: the simplicity of the construction of the ISASMELT furnaces and the ability to treat concentrate without drying make it cheaper than other smelting processes.

== History of the process ==
=== Early development (1973–1980) ===
The ISASMELT process began with the invention in 1973 of the Sirosmelt lance by Drs Bill Denholm and John Floyd at the CSIRO. The lance was developed as a result of investigations into improved tin-smelting processes, in which it was found that the use of a top-entry submerged lance would result in greater heat transfer and mass transfer efficiencies.

The idea of top-entry submerged lances goes back to at least 1902, when such a system was attempted in Clichy, France. However, early attempts failed because of the short lives of the lances on submersion in the bath. The Mitsubishi copper smelting process is one alternative approach, wherein lances are used in a furnace, but they are not submerged into the bath. Instead, they blow oxygen-enriched air onto the surface of the slag (top jetting). Similarly, a water-cooled, top-jetting lance was the basis of the LD (Linz-Donawitz) steelmaking process. This does not produce the same intensity of mixing in the bath as a submerged lance.

The CSIRO scientists first tried developing a submerged lance system using a water-cooled lance, but moved to an air-cooled system because "scale up of the water-cooled lance would have been problematic". Introducing any water to a system involving molten metals and slags can result in catastrophic explosions, such as that in the Scunthorpe Steelworks in November 1975 in which 11 men lost their lives.

The inclusion of the swirlers in the Sirosmelt lance and forming a splash coating of slag on the lance were the major innovations that led to the successful development of submerged lance smelting.

From 1973, the CSIRO scientists began a series of trials using the Sirosmelt lance to recover metals from industrial slags in Australia, including lead softener slag at the Broken Hill Associated Smelters in Port Pirie (1973), tin slag from Associated Tin Smelters in Sydney (1974), copper converter slag at the Electrolytic Refining and Smelting ("ER&S") Port Kembla plant (1975) and copper anode furnace slag at Copper Refineries Limited (another subsidiary of MIM Holdings) in Townsville (1976) and of copper converter slag in Mount Isa (1977). The work then proceeded to smelting tin concentrates (1975) and then sulfidic tin concentrates (1977).

MIM and ER&S jointly funded the 1975 Port Kembla converter slag treatment trials and MIM's involvement continued with the slag treatment work in Townsville and Mount Isa.

In parallel with the copper slag treatment work, the CSIRO was continuing to work in tin smelting. Projects included a five tonne ("t") plant for recovering tin from slag being installed at Associated Tin Smelters in 1978, and the first sulfidic smelting test work being done in collaboration with Aberfoyle Limited, in which tin was fumed from pyritic tin ore and from mixed tin and copper concentrates. Aberfoyle was investigating the possibility of using the Sirosmelt lance approach to improve the recovery of tin from complex ores, such as its mine at Cleveland, Tasmania, and the Queen Hill ore zone near Zeehan in Tasmania.

The Aberfoyle work led to the construction and operation in late 1980 of a four t/h tin matte fuming pilot plant at the Western Mining Corporation's Kalgoorlie Nickel Smelter, located to the south of Kalgoorlie, Western Australia.

=== Lead ISASMELT development ===
==== Small-scale work (1978–1983) ====
In the early 1970s, the traditional blast furnace and sinter plant technology that was the mainstay of the lead smelting industry was coming under sustained pressure from more stringent environmental requirements, increased energy costs, decreasing metal prices and rising capital and operating costs.

Many smelting companies were seeking new processes to replace sinter plants and blast furnaces. Possibilities included the QSL lead smelting process, the Kivcet process, the Kaldo top-blown rotary converter, and adapting Outokumpu's successful copper and nickel flash furnace to lead smelting.

MIM was seeking ways to safeguard the future of its Mount Isa lead smelting operations. It did this in two ways:

1. working to improve the environmental and operational performance of its existing operations
2. investigating new technologies.

MIM investigated new technologies by arranging plant testing of large parcels of Mount Isa lead concentrates for all the then process options except for the Kivcet process. At the same time, it had been aware of the use of top-jetting lances in the Mitsubishi and Kaldo processes, and of top-entry submerged combustion lance investigations undertaken by Asarco (which had a long association with MIM, including being a shareholder in MIM Holdings) in the 1960s. This stimulated MIM's interest in the Sirosmelt lance, which was seen as a way to produce a robust submerged lance.

Following the copper slag trials of 1976–1978, MIM initiated a joint project with the CSIRO in 1978 to investigate the possibility of applying Sirosmelt lances to lead smelting.

The work began with computer modelling the equilibrium thermodynamics (1978) and was followed by laboratory bench-scale test work using large alumina silicate crucibles (1978–1979). The results were sufficiently encouraging that MIM built a 120 kg/h test rig in Mount Isa. It began operation in September 1980. This was used to develop a two-stage process to produce lead bullion from Mount Isa lead concentrate. The first stage was an oxidation step that removed virtually all the sulfur from the feed, oxidising the contained lead to lead oxide (PbO) that was largely collected in the slag (some was carried out of the furnace as lead oxide fume that was returned for lead recovery). The second stage was a reduction step in which the oxygen was removed from the lead to form lead metal.

==== The lead ISASMELT pilot plant (1983–1990) ====
Following the 120 kg/h test work, MIM decided to proceed to install a 5 t/h lead ISASMELT pilot plant in its Mount Isa lead smelter. It bought Aberfoyle's matte fuming furnace and transported it from Kalgoorlie to Mount Isa, where it was rebuilt and commissioned in 1983 to demonstrate the first stage of the process in continuous operation and for testing the reduction step using batches of high-lead slag.

One of the key features of the pilot plant was that it was run by operations’ personnel in the lead smelter as though it was an operations’ plant. The high lead slag produced by the continuous smelting of the lead concentrate was subsequently treated in the sinter plant, thus increasing the production of the lead smelter by up to 17%. This gave the operations’ people ownership of the plant and an incentive to make it work, thus ensuring management and maintenance priority. It also gave MIM assurance that the process was simple enough to be operable in a production environment, with normal staff and supervision, and that it was robust enough to withstand normal control excursions. In addition to the continuous operation of lead concentrate to produce high-lead slag, the pilot plant was used to produce lead metal from batches of the slag, investigate the wear rates of the furnace's refractory lining and lances, and initial work aimed at developing a low-pressure version of the Sirosmelt lance. The result was a lance design that allowed operation at significantly lower pressure than the initial values of about 250 kilopascal (gauge) ("kPag"), thus reducing operating costs.

MIM built a second, identical furnace next to the first, and commissioned it in August 1985. This combination of furnaces was used to demonstrate the two-stage process in continuous operation in mid-1987. However, for most of the time the two furnaces were not able to operate simultaneously due to a constraint in the capacity of the baghouse used to filter the lead dust from the waste gas.

A series of process improvements, particularly in the waste gas handling system, resulted in increasing the throughput of the plant from the initial design of 5 t/h to 10 t/h. The pilot plant had treated more than 125,000 t of lead concentrate by April 1989.

The two furnaces were also used to develop a process to recover lead from the Mount Isa lead smelter's drossing operations.

==== The lead ISASMELT demonstration plant (1991–1995) ====
Based on the results of the pilot plant work, the MIM Holdings Board of Directors approved the construction of an A$65 million demonstration plant, capable of producing 60,000 t/y of lead bullion. This plant operated from early 1991 until 1995. It was initially designed to treat 20 t/h of lead concentrate using lance air enriched to 27%. However, the oxygen originally designated for its use was diverted to the more profitable copper smelting operations, and the feed rate to the lead ISASMELT demonstration plant was severely restricted. When there was sufficient oxygen available in 1993 to increase the enrichment level to 33–35%, treatment rates of up to 36 t/h of concentrate were achieved, with residual lead in the final reduction furnace slag being in the range of 2–5%.

The two-stage approach to ISASMELT lead smelting was partly driven by the relatively low lead content of Mount Isa lead concentrates (typically in the range of 47–52% lead during the lead ISASMELT development period). Trying to produce lead bullion in a single furnace with such low concentrate grades would result in excessive fuming of lead oxide with a huge amount of material that would have to be returned to the furnace to recover the lead and, consequently, a higher energy demand as that material had to be reheated to the furnace temperatures.

Concentrates with higher lead contents can be smelted directly into lead metal in a single furnace without excess fuming. This was demonstrated on the large scale in 1994, when 4000 t of concentrate containing 67% lead were treated at rates up to 32 t/h with lance air enriched to 27%. During these trials, 50% of the lead in the concentrate was converted to lead bullion in the smelting furnace, while most of the rest ended up as lead oxide in the smelting furnace slag.

Like the lead ISASMELT pilot plant, the lead ISASMELT demonstration plant suffered from constraints imposed by the waste gas handling system. In the case of the demonstration plant, the problem was caused by sticky fume that formed an insulating layer on the convection tube bundles of the waste heat boilers, significantly reducing the heat transfer rates and thus the ability of the boilers to reduce the waste gas temperature. As the plant used baghouses to filter lead fume from the waste gas, it was necessary to reduce the temperature of the gas below the point at which the bags would be damaged by high temperatures. The problem was solved by allowing cool air to mix with the hot waste gas to lower the temperature to a level at which the baghouse could operate. This reduced the ISASMELT plant's capacity because it was again limited by the volume of gas that could be filtered by the baghouse.

The lead ISASMELT demonstration plant was mothballed in 1995 because there was insufficient concentrate to keep both it and the rest of the lead smelter operating. It was too small to treat all the Mount Isa lead concentrate by itself.

==== Commercial primary-lead ISASMELT plants (since 2005) ====
The first commercial primary-lead ISASMELT furnace was installed at the Yunnan Chihong Zinc and Germanium Company Limited (YCZG) greenfield zinc and lead smelting complex at Qujing in Yunnan Province in China. This furnace was part of a plant consisting of the ISASMELT furnace and a blast furnace specially designed to treat high-lead ISASMELT slag. The ISASMELT furnace was designed to produce both the slag and lead bullion, with about 40% of the lead in the concentrate being converted to lead bullion in the ISASMELT furnace.

The ISASMELT–blast furnace combination was designed to treat 160,000 t/y of lead concentrate.

The second commercial primary-lead ISASMELT furnace was commissioned at Kazzinc's smelting complex at Ust-Kamenogorsk in Kazakhstan in 2012. It is designed to treat 300,000 t/y of lead concentrate, again using an ISASMELT–blast furnace combination.

YCZG is constructing another lead ISASMELT at a new greenfield smelter in Huize in China, and this is due to be commissioned in 2013.

In June 2017, Glencore announced that Nyrstar NV had acquired an Isasmelt licence for its new Ausmelt furnace in Port Pirie. As part of the agreement, Nyrstar engaged training and ramp-up support services for the Ausmelt furnace and blast furnace by personnel from Glencore's Kazzinc operations in Kazakhstan. This involved training Nyrstar personnel at Ust-Kamenogorsk operations and site support by Kazzinc personnel during the commissioning and ramp-up stages of the Ausmelt plant.

==== Secondary-lead smelting (since 1982) ====
While the lead ISASMELT 5 t/h pilot plant was being designed in 1982–1983, MIM continued to use the 120 kg/h test rig to develop other processes, including the dross treatment process previously mentioned, and the treatment of lead-acid battery paste for lead recycling.

The MIM Holdings Board of Directors approved the construction of an ISASMELT plant at Britannia Refined Metals, the company's lead refinery at Northfleet in the United Kingdom, for commercial recovery of lead from battery paste to supplement the existing plant, which used a short rotary furnace to produce 10,000 t/y of lead. The new plant increased annual production to 30,000 t/y of recycled lead, and was commissioned in 1991. The ISASMELT furnace was used to produce low-antimony lead bullion from the battery paste and an antimony-rich slag that contained 55–65% lead oxide. While it was possible to recover the lead from the slag in the ISASMELT furnace by a reduction step, the total throughput of the plant was increased by treating the slag in the short rotary furnace when sufficient quantities of the slag had been generated. The plant was designed to treat 7.7 t/h of battery paste, but routinely treated 12 t/h. The plant was shut down in 2004 when Xstrata Zinc, which took over the MIM Holdings lead operations, decided to leave the lead recycling business.

A second lead ISASMELT plant for recovering lead from recycled batteries was commissioned in 2000 in Malaysia at Metal Reclamation Industries’ Pulau Indah plant. This ISASMELT plant has a design capacity of 40,000 t/y of lead bullion.

=== Copper ISASMELT development ===
==== Small-scale test work (1979–1987) ====
Scientists at the CSIRO conducted small-scale test work on copper sulfide concentrate in 1979, using the CSIRO's 50 kg Sirosmelt test rig. These trials included producing copper matte containing 40–52% copper and, in some cases, converting the matte to produce blister copper.

The results of this work were sufficiently encouraging that MIM in 1983 undertook its own copper smelting test work program using its 120 kg/h test rig, which had by then been rerated to 250 kg/h. It was found that the process was easy to control and that copper loss to slag was low. It was also learned that the process could easily recover copper from copper converter slag concentrate, of which there was a large stockpile at Mount Isa.

==== The copper ISASMELT demonstration plant (1987–1992) ====
Construction of a 15 t/h demonstration copper ISASMELT plant began in 1986. The design was based on MIM's 250 kg/h test work and operating experience with the lead ISASMELT pilot plant. It cost A$11 million and was commissioned in April 1987. The initial capital cost was recovered in the first 14 months of operation.

As with the lead ISASMELT pilot plant, the copper ISASMELT demonstration plant was integrated into copper smelter operations and justified by the 20% (30,000 t/y) increase in copper production that it provided. It quickly treated the entire backlog of converter slag concentrate, which could not be treated at high rates in the reverberatory furnaces without generating magnetite ("Fe_{3}O_{4}") accretions that would necessitate shutting down the reverberatory furnaces for their removal.

The demonstration copper ISASMELT plant was used to further develop the copper process. Refractory life was initially shorter than expected and considerable effort was devoted to understanding the reasons and attempting to extend the life of the refractories. At the end of the life of the demonstration plant, the longest refractory life achieved was 90 weeks.

Lance life was also low initially. Inexperienced operators could destroy a lance in as little as 10 minutes. However, as a result of modifications to the lance design, the development of techniques to determine the position of the lance in the bath, and a rise in the operating experience, the typical lance life was extended to a week.

The demonstration plant was commissioned with high-pressure (700 kPag) air injected down the lance. Later, after extensive testing of low-pressure lance designs and trials using oxygen enrichment of the lance air, a 70 t/d oxygen plant and a 5 Nm3/s blower with a discharge pressure of 146 kPag were purchased. The new lance design was capable of operating at pressures below 100 kPag. Using enrichment of the oxygen in the lance air to 35%, the demonstration plant throughput was lifted to 48 t/h of concentrate, and the gross energy used during smelting was reduced from 25.6 GJ/t of contained copper to 4.1 GJ/t.

==== Commercial primary-copper ISASMELT plants (since 1990) ====
The successful operation and development of the demonstration copper ISASMELT, and the degree of interest shown in the new process by the global smelting community, gave MIM Holdings sufficient confidence to license the ISASMELT technology to external companies, so an agreement under which MIM could incorporate the Sirosmelt lance into ISASMELT technology was signed with the CSIRO in 1989.

===== AGIP Australia =====
MIM signed the first ISASMELT licence agreement with Agip Australia Proprietary Limited ("Agip") in July 1990. Agip, a subsidiary of the Italian oil company ENI, was developing the Radio Hill nickel-copper deposit near Karratha in Western Australia. MIM and representatives of Agip conducted a series of trials in which 4 tonnes of Radio Hill concentrate was smelted in the 250 kg/h test rig at Mount Isa.

The Agip ISASMELT plant was designed to treat 7.5 t/h of the Radio Hill concentrate and produce 1.5 t/h of granulated matte with a combined nickel and copper content of 45% for sale. It was the same size as the copper ISASMELT demonstration plant (2.3 m internal diameter) and had a 5.5 Nm3/s blower to provide the lance air. Commissioning of the plant began in September 1991; however, the Radio Hill mine and smelter complex were forced to close by low nickel prices after less than six months, before commissioning was completed. The ISASMELT furnace achieved its design capacity within three months. Subsequent owners of the mine focused on mining and mineral processing only, and the ISASMELT plant has been dismantled.

===== Freeport-McMoRan Copper and Gold =====
In 1973, the Freeport-McMoRan Copper and Gold ("Freeport") smelter at Miami, Arizona, installed a 51 MW electric furnace at its Miami smelter. The decision was based on a long-term electrical power contract with the Salt River Project that provided the company with a very low rate for electricity. This contract expired in 1990 and the resulting increase in electricity prices prompted the owners of the smelter, Cyprus Miami Mining Corporation ("Cyprus"), to seek alternative smelting technologies for lower operating costs.

The technologies evaluated included:

- Contop flame cyclone reactor
- Inco flash furnace
- ISASMELT
- Mitsubishi furnace
- Noranda reactor
- Outokumpu flash furnace
- Teniente furnace.

The Contop, Inco, Mitsubishi and Outokumpu processes "were all eliminated primarily because of their high dust levels, high capital costs and poor adaptability to the existing facility". The Teniente converter was ruled out because it required the use of the electric furnace for partial smelting. The Noranda reactor was not selected "because of its high refractory wear and its poor adaptability to the existing plant due to the handling of the reactor slag". ISASMELT was chosen as the preferred technology and a licence agreement was signed with MIM in October 1990. The major factor in the decision to select the ISASMELT technology was the ability to fit it into the existing plant and to maximise the use of existing equipment and infrastructure, while the major disadvantage was seen to be the risks associated with scaling up the technology from the Mount Isa demonstration plant.

The Miami copper ISASMELT furnace was designed to treat 590,000 t/y (650,000 short tons per year) of copper concentrate, a treatment rate that was constrained by the capacity of the sulfuric acid plant used to capture the sulfur dioxide from the smelter's waste gases. The existing electric furnace was converted from smelting duties to a slag cleaning furnace and providing matte surge capacity for the converters. The ISASMELT furnace was commissioned on 11 June 1992 and in 2002 treated over 700,000 t/y of concentrate. The modernisation of the Miami smelter cost an estimated US$95 million.

In 1993, the Cyprus Minerals Company merged with AMAX to form the Cyprus Amax Minerals company, which was in turn taken over by the Phelps Dodge Corporation in late 1999. After the take-over, Phelps Dodge closed its Hidalgo and Chino smelters. Phelps Dodge was acquired by Freeport in 2006.

The Miami smelter is one of only two remaining operating copper smelters in the United States, down from 16 in 1979.

===== Mount Isa Mines =====
The third commercial copper ISASMELT plant was installed in MIM's Mount Isa copper smelter at a cost of approximately A$100 million. It was designed to treat 104 t/h of copper concentrate, containing 180,000 t/y of copper, and it began operation in August 1992.

A significant difference between the Mount Isa copper ISASMELT plant and all the others is that it uses an Ahlstrom Fluxflow waste heat boiler to recover heat from the furnace waste gas. This boiler uses a recirculating fluid bed of particles to rapidly quench the gas as it leaves the furnace, and then uses the enhanced heat transfer properties of solid–solid contact to cool the particles as they are carried past boiler tubes that are suspended in a shaft above the bed. The high heat transfer rate means that the Fluxflow boiler is relatively compact compared with conventional waste heat boilers and the rapid cooling of the waste gas limits the formation of sulfur trioxide ("SO_{3}"), which in the presence of water forms sulfuric acid that can cause corrosion of cool surfaces.

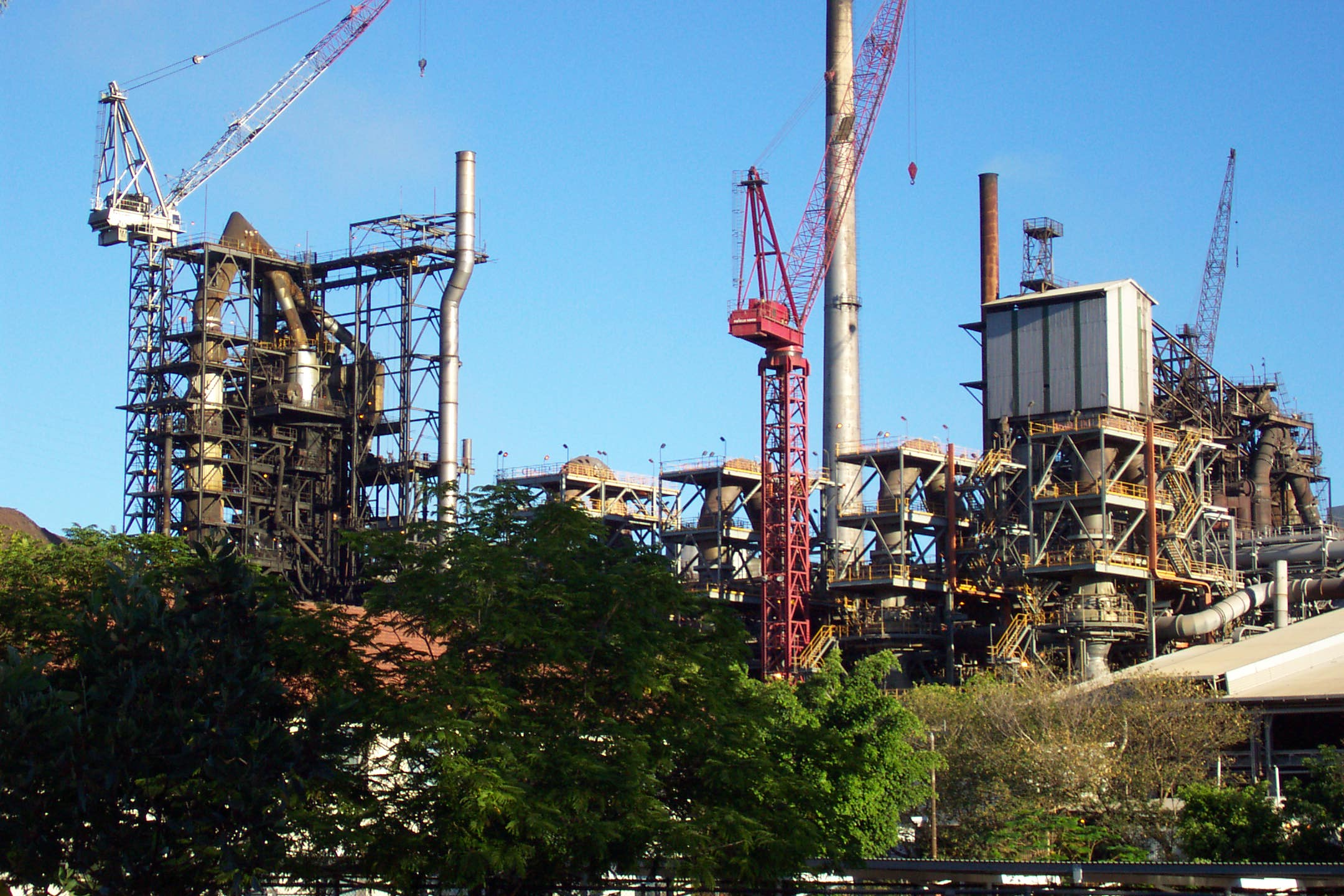
Mount Isa copper smelter in 2002. The building beneath the left-hand crane is the ISASMELT plant.

In its early years, the Fluxflow boiler was the cause of significant down time, because the rate of wear of the boiler tubes was much higher than expected. The problems were solved by understanding the gas flows within the boiler and redesigning the boiler tubes to minimise the effects of erosion.

The life of the refractory bricks in the ISASMELT furnace was initially shorter than expected and a water cooling system was briefly considered to extend them; however, this was not installed and operational improvements resulted in a significant extension of the lining life without this capital and operating expense. Since 1998, the refractory lining lives have exceeded their two-year design, with lives of the 8th and 9th linings nearly reaching three years. The most recent lining lasted for 50 months, with the one before that lasting for 44 months.

In the first years of operation at Mount Isa, the throughput of the ISASMELT furnace was constrained by problems with some of the ancillary equipment in the plant, including the boiler, slag granulation system and concentrate filters. The ultimate constraint was the decision during its construction to keep one of the two reverberatory furnaces on line to increase the copper smelter production to 265,000 t/y of anode copper. The smelter's Peirce-Smith converters became a bottleneck and the feed rate of the ISASMELT furnace had to be restrained to allow sufficient matte to be drawn from the reverberatory furnace to prevent it freezing solid. The ISASMELT 12-month rolling average of the feed rate fell just short of 100 t/h for much of this period, not quite reaching the design annual average of 104 t/h. MIM decided to shut down the reverberatory furnace in 1997, and the ISASMELT plant 12-month rolling mean feed rate quickly exceeded the 104 t/h design when this constraint was lifted.

The performance of the ISASMELT plant was sufficiently encouraging that MIM decided to expand the ISASMELT treatment rate to 166 t/h by adding a second oxygen plant to allow higher enrichment of the lance air. As a result, by late 2001 it had achieved a peak rate of 190 t/h of concentrate, and the smelter produced a peak annual total of 240,000 t of anode copper. At that time, the Mount Isa copper smelter, together with its copper refinery in Townsville, was among the lowest cost copper smelters in the world.

Lance life is typically two weeks, with lance changes taking 30 to 40 minutes, and repairs usually being limited to replacement of the lance tips.

In 2006, MIM commissioned a second rotary holding furnace that operates in parallel with the existing holding furnace.

===== Sterlite Industries =====
Sterlite Industries ("Sterlite"), a subsidiary of Vedanta Resources, built a copper smelter in Tuticorin using an ISASMELT furnace and Peirce-Smith converters. The smelter was commissioned in 1996 and was designed to produce 60,000 t/y of copper (450,000 t/y of copper concentrate), but by increasing the oxygen content of the lance air and making modifications to other equipment, the ISASMELT furnace feed rate was increased to the point where the smelter was producing 180,000 t/y of copper.

Sterlite commissioned a new ISASMELT furnace in May 2005 that was designed to treat 1.3 million t/y of copper concentrate, and the smelter's production capacity was expanded to 300,000 t/y of copper. The new plant reached its design capacity, measured over a three-month period, six months after it started treating its first feed. Vedanta's website states that the new ISASMELT furnace was successfully ramped up "in a record period of 45 days".

Since then Sterlite decided to further expand its copper production by installing a third ISASMELT smelter and new refinery using IsaKidd technology. The new smelter has a design capacity of 1.36 million t/y of copper concentrate (containing 400,000 t/y of copper), processed through a single ISASMELT furnace.

===== Yunnan Copper Corporation =====
In the 1990s, the Chinese government decided to increase the efficiency of the Chinese economy and reduce the environmental effects of heavy industry by modernising plants. As a response, the Yunnan Copper Corporation ("YCC") upgraded its existing plant, which was based on a sinter plant and an electric furnace, with a copper ISASMELT furnace. As with the Miami smelter, the electric furnace was converted from smelting duty to separation of matte and slag and providing matte surge capacity for the converters, and again, the small footprint of the ISASMELT furnace was very important in retrofitting it to the existing smelter.

The YCC ISASMELT plant had a design capacity of 600,000 dry t/y of copper concentrate and started smelting concentrate on 15 May 2002. YCC placed a lot of emphasis on training its operators, sending people to Mount Isa for training over a seven-month period during 2001 ahead of the ISASMELT commissioning. The total cost of the smelter modernisation program, including the ISASMELT furnace, was 640 million yuan (approximately US$80 million) and the smelter's concentrate treatment rate increased from 470,000 t/y to 800,000 t/y as a result.

The transfer of operating knowledge from MIM to YCC was sufficient for the first ISASMELT furnace refractory lining to last for two years, a marked improvement on the life of the initial lining of other plants.

YCC described the modernisation project as "a great success, achieving all that was expected." Energy consumption per tonne of blister copper produced decreased by 34% as a result of installing the ISASMELT furnace, and YCC estimated that during the first 38 months of operation, it saved approximately US$31.4 million through reduced energy costs alone, giving the modernisation a very short payback by industry standards.

In 2004, YCC's management was presented with awards for Innovation in Project Management and the National Medal for High Quality Projects by the Chinese government to mark the success of the smelter modernisation project.

Xstrata subsequently licensed YCC to build three more ISASMELT plants, one in Chuxiong in Yunnan Province, China to treat 500,000 t/y of copper concentrate, one in Liangshan in Sichuan Province, China and the other in Chambishi in Zambia to treat 350,000 t/y of concentrate. Chuxiong and Chambishi were commissioned in 2009. Liangshan was commissioned in 2012.

- Mopani Copper Mines, as part of Zambia Consolidated Copper Mines Limited

===== Southern Peru Copper Corporation =====
In the 1990s, Southern Peru Copper Corporation ("SPCC") was seeking to modernise its smelter at Ilo in southern Peru as part of 1997 commitment to the Peruvian government to capture at least 91.7% of the sulfur dioxide generated in its smelting operations by January 2007. It initially selected flash smelting technology to replace its reverberatory furnaces, at a cost of almost US$1 billion; however, one of the first actions following Grupo México's acquisition of ASARCO was to review the proposed Ilo smelter modernisation plans.

===== Kazzinc =====
Kazzinc selected the copper ISASMELT process for its Ust-Kamenogorsk metallurgical complex. It is designed to treat 290,000 t/y of copper concentrate and was commissioned in 2011. A projected capital cost for the smelter and refinery in 2006 was US$178 million.

==== Commercial secondary-copper ISASMELT plants ====
In addition to treating copper concentrates, ISASMELT furnaces have also been built to treat secondary (scrap) copper materials.

===== Umicore =====
In the early 1990s, technical personnel from the then Union Miniére worked with MIM Holdings personnel to develop an ISASMELT-based process to treat scrap materials and residues containing copper and lead. Union Miniére operated a smelter at Hoboken, near Antwerpen in Belgium, that specialised in recycling scrap non-ferrous materials. The test work program was undertaken using an ISASMELT test rig at MIM Holdings’ lead refinery, Britannia Refined Metals, at Northfleet in the United Kingdom.

A demonstration plant was designed by MIM Holdings personnel and operated for several months at the Hoboken smelter site. The new smelter was commissioned in the final quarter of 1997 and in 2007 was treating up to 300,000 t/y of secondary materials. The installation of the ISASMELT furnace replaced a roasting plant, a sinter plant, 1 of two sulfuric acid plants, a copper blast furnace and four Hoboken converters. It substantially reduced operating costs at the Hoboken smelter.

Umicore's Hoboken plant uses a two-step process in a single furnace. The first step involves the oxidation of the feed to form a copper matte and a lead-rich slag. The slag is then tapped and the remaining copper matte is then converted to blister copper. The lead-rich slag is subsequently reduced in a blast furnace to produce lead metal, while the copper is refined and the contained precious metals recovered.

===== Aurubis =====
The Hüttenwerke Kayser smelter at Lünen in Germany installed an ISASMELT plant in 2002 to replace three blast furnaces and one Peirce-Smith converter used for smelting scrap copper. The company was subsequently bought by Norddeutsche Affinerie AG, which in turn became Aurubis.

The process used at the Lünen smelter involves charging the furnace with copper residues and scrap containing between 1 and 80% copper and then melting it in a reducing environment. This produces a "black copper phase" and a low-copper silica slag. Initially the black copper was converted to blister copper in the ISASMELT furnace. However, in 2011 the smelter was expanded as part of the "KRS Plus" project. A top-blown rotary converter is used to convert the black copper and the ISASMELT furnace runs continuously in smelting mode.

The installation of the ISASMELT furnace increased the overall copper recovery in the plant by reducing losses to slag, reduced the number of furnaces in operation, decreased the waste gas volume, and decreased energy consumption by more than 50%. The production capacity exceeds the original design by 40%.

Kandanshi

Atlantic Copper
