= Smelting =

Use of heat and a reducing agent to extract metal from ore

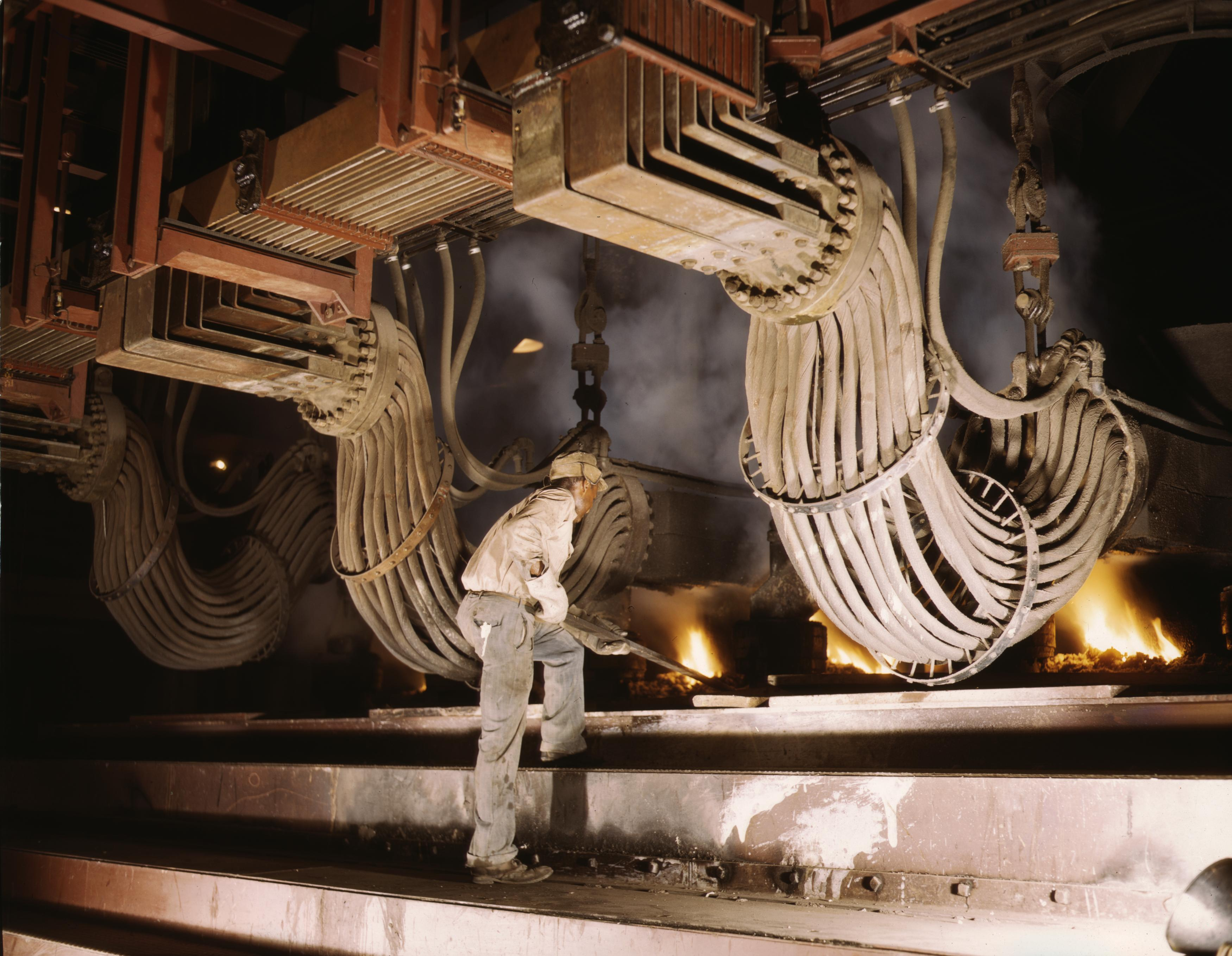
Electric phosphate smelting furnace in a TVA chemical plant (1942)

Smelting is a process of applying heat and a chemical reducing agent to an ore to extract a desired base metal product. It is a form of extractive metallurgy that is used to obtain many metals such as iron, copper, silver, tin, lead.

Smelting uses heat and a chemical reducing agent to decompose the ore, driving off other elements as gases or slag and leaving the metal behind. The reducing agent is commonly a fossil-fuel source of carbon, such as carbon monoxide from incomplete combustion of coke—or, in earlier times, of charcoal. The oxygen in the ore binds to carbon at high temperatures, as the chemical potential energy of the bonds in carbon dioxide (CO_{2}) is lower than that of the bonds in the ore.

Sulfide ores such as those commonly used to obtain copper, zinc, or lead, are roasted before smelting in order to convert the sulfides to oxides, which are more readily reduced to the metal. Roasting heats the ore in the presence of oxygen from air, oxidizing the ore and liberating the sulfur as sulfur dioxide gas.

Iron ore is smelted in a blast furnace to produce pig iron, which is converted into steel.

== Aluminium ==
Aluminium cannot be smelted like most other metals, such as copper or iron, because aluminium forms a very stable compound with oxygen, and the oxide has a melting point of about 2,072°C (3,762°F). Aluminium is more reactive than carbon, therefore carbon cannot smelt aluminum. Aluminium is smelted by electrolytic reduction of aluminium oxide dissolved in molten cryolite. Plants for the electrolytic reduction of aluminium are referred to as aluminium smelters.

== Custom smelters ==
Smelters can be classified into two types depending on their business model; custom smelters and integrated smelters. A custom smelter is a smelter that treats ore on behalf of customers or buys ore for treatment. Custom smelters obtain ore concentrates from mines of different ownership. Integrated smelters depend directly on a specific mining operation and tend to be located next to a mine.

== Process ==
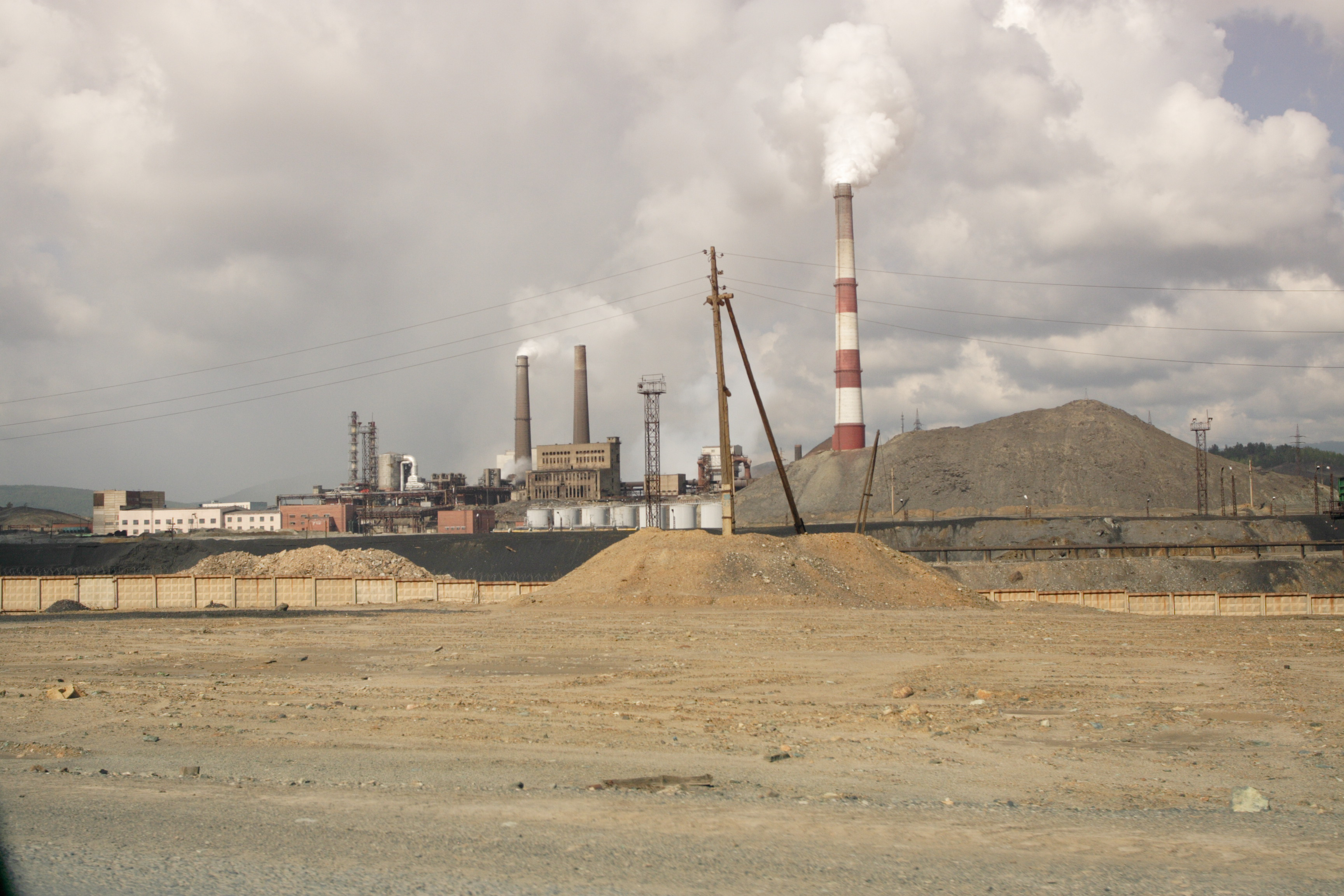
Copper smelter, Chelyabinsk Oblast, Russia

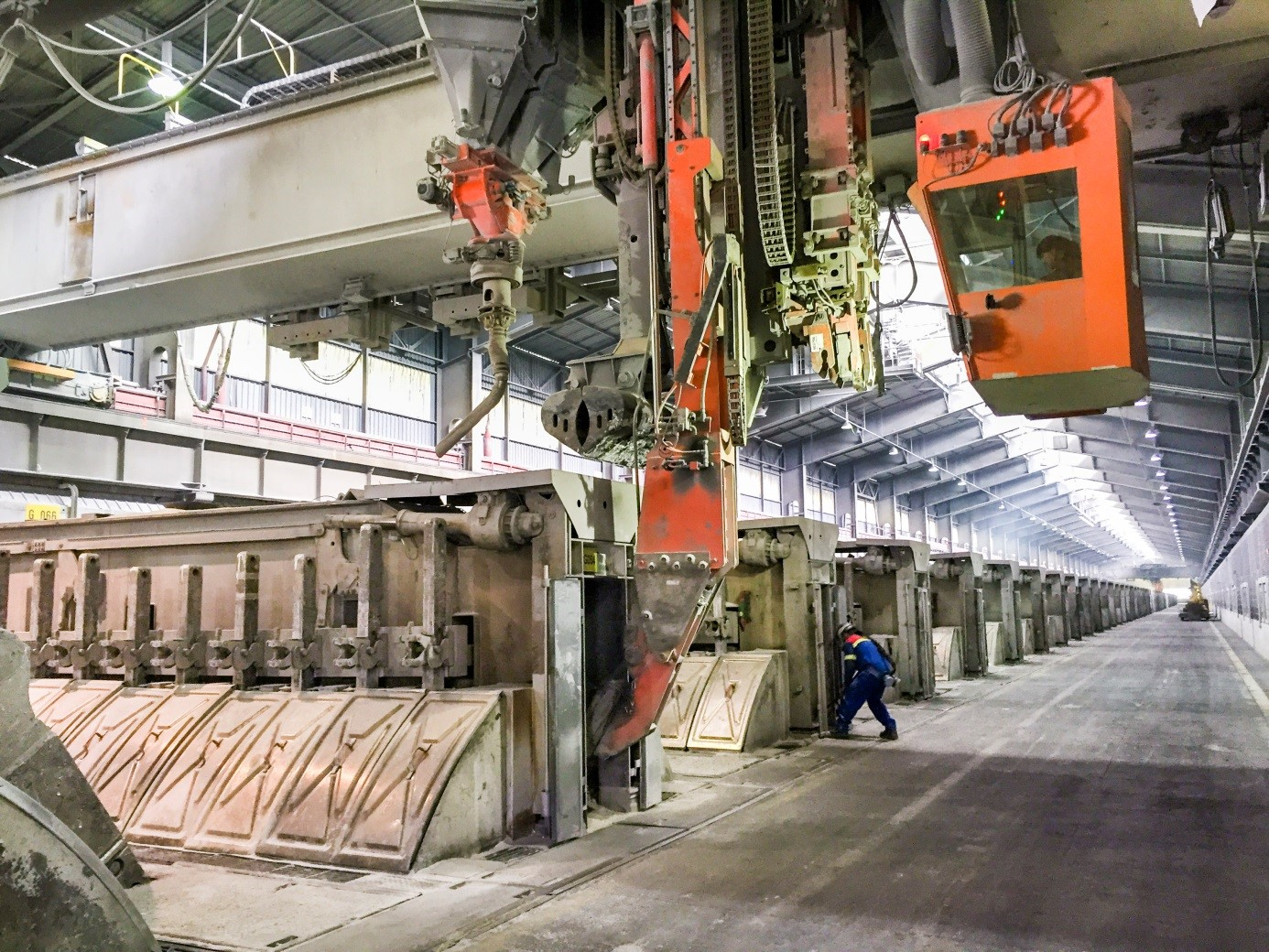
Electrolytic cells at an aluminum smelter in Saint-Jean-de-Maurienne, France

Smelting involves more than just melting the metal out of its ore. Most ores comprise chemical compounds of the metal and other elements, such as oxygen (as an oxide), sulfur (as a sulfide), or carbon and oxygen together (as a carbonate). To extract the metal, workers must make these compounds undergo a chemical reaction. Smelting, therefore, consists of using suitable reducing substances that combine with those oxidizing elements to free the metal.

=== Roasting ===
In the case of sulfides and carbonates, a process called "roasting" removes the unwanted carbon or sulfur, leaving an oxide, which is more suitable for reduction to metal. Roasting is usually carried out in an oxidizing environment. A few practical examples:

For sulfide ores, roasting results in replacement of sulfide, partly or completely, by oxide. For molybdenum disulfide, the main ore of Mo, roasting proceeds as follows:

MoS_{2} + 3O_{2} → MoO_{2} + 2 SO_{2}

=== Reduction ===
Reduction is the final, high-temperature step in smelting, in which the oxide becomes the elemental metal. A reducing environment (often provided by carbon monoxide, made by incomplete combustion in an air-starved furnace) pulls the final oxygen atoms from the raw metal. The carbon source acts as a chemical reactant to remove oxygen from the ore, yielding the purified metal element as a product. The carbon source is oxidized in two stages. First, carbon (C) combusts with oxygen (O_{2}) in the air to produce carbon monoxide (CO). Second, the carbon monoxide reacts with the ore (e.g. Fe_{2}O_{3}) and removes one of its oxygen atoms, releasing carbon dioxide (CO_{2}). After successive interactions with carbon monoxide, all of the oxygen in the ore will be removed, leaving the raw metal element (e.g. Fe). As most ores are impure, it is often necessary to use flux, such as limestone (or dolomite), to remove the accompanying rock gangue as slag. This calcination reaction emits carbon dioxide.

The required temperature varies both in absolute terms and in terms of the melting point of the base metal. Examples:

- Iron oxide becomes metallic iron at roughly 1250 °C (2282 °F or 1523 K), almost 300 degrees below iron's melting point of 1538 °C (2800 °F or 1811 K).
- Mercuric oxide becomes vaporous mercury near 550 °C (1022 °F or 823 K), almost 600 degrees above mercury's melting point of -38 °C (-36.4 °F or 235 K), and also above mercury's boiling point.

=== Fluxes ===
Fluxes are materials added to the ore during smelting to catalyze the desired reactions and to chemically bind to unwanted impurities or reaction products. Calcium carbonate or calcium oxide in the form of lime are often used for this purpose, since they react with sulfur, phosphorus, and silicon impurities to allow them to be readily separated and discarded, in the form of slag. Fluxes may also serve to control the viscosity and neutralize unwanted acids.

Flux and slag can provide a secondary service after the reduction step is complete; they provide a molten cover on the purified metal, preventing contact with oxygen while still hot enough to readily oxidize. This prevents impurities from forming in the metal.

=== Sulfide ores ===
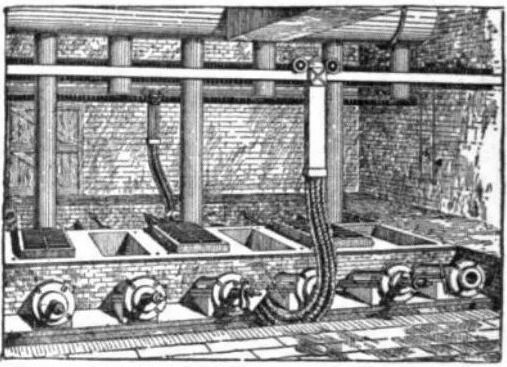
Cowles Syndicate of Ohio in Stoke-upon-Trent England, late 1880s. British Aluminium used the process of Paul Héroult about this time.

The ores of base metals are often sulfides. In recent centuries, reverberatory furnaces have been used to keep the charge being smelted separately from the fuel. Traditionally, they were used for the first step of smelting: forming two liquids, one an oxide slag containing most of the impurities, and the other a sulfide matte containing the valuable metal sulfide and some impurities. Such "reverb" furnaces are today about 40 meters long, 3 meters high, and 10 meters wide. Fuel is burned at one end to melt the dry sulfide concentrates (usually after partial roasting) which are fed through openings in the roof of the furnace. The slag floats over the heavier matte and is removed and discarded or recycled. The sulfide matte is then sent to the converter. The precise details of the process vary from one furnace to another depending on the mineralogy of the ore body.

While reverberatory furnaces produced slags containing very little copper, they were relatively energy inefficient and off-gassed a low concentration of sulfur dioxide that was difficult to capture; a new generation of copper smelting technologies has supplanted them. More recent furnaces exploit bath smelting, top-jetting lance smelting, flash smelting, and blast furnaces. Some examples of bath smelters include the Noranda furnace, the Isasmelt furnace, the Teniente reactor, the Vunyukov smelter, and the SKS technology. Top-jetting lance smelters include the Mitsubishi smelting reactor. Flash smelters account for over 50% of the world's copper smelters. There are many more varieties of smelting processes, including the Kivset, Ausmelt, Tamano, EAF, and BF.

== History ==
Of the seven metals known in antiquity, only gold regularly occurs in nature as a native metal. The others – copper, lead, silver, tin, iron, and mercury – occur primarily as minerals, although native copper is occasionally found in commercially significant quantities. These minerals are primarily carbonates, sulfides, or oxides of the metal, mixed with other components such as silica and alumina. Roasting the carbonate and sulfide minerals in the air converts them to oxides. The oxides, in turn, are smelted into the metal. Carbon monoxide was (and is) the reducing agent of choice for smelting. It is easily produced during the heating process, and as a gas comes into intimate contact with the ore.

The discovery and use of the "useful" metals – copper and bronze at first, then iron a few millennia later – had an enormous impact on human society. The impact was so pervasive that scholars traditionally divide ancient history into Stone Age, Bronze Age, and Iron Age.

In the Americas, pre-Inca civilizations of the central Andes in Peru had mastered the smelting of copper and silver at least six centuries before the first Europeans arrived in the 16th century, while never mastering the smelting of metals such as iron for use with weapon craft.

=== Copper and bronze ===
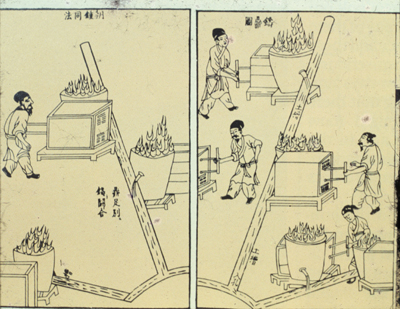
Casting bronze ding-tripods, from the Chinese Tiangong Kaiwu encyclopedia of Song Yingxing, published in 1637

Copper was the first metal to be smelted. How the discovery came about is debated. Campfires are about 200°C short of the temperature needed, so some propose that the first smelting of copper may have occurred in pottery kilns. (The development of copper smelting in the Andes, which is believed to have occurred independently of the Old World, may have occurred in the same way.)

The earliest current evidence of copper smelting, dating from between 5500 BC and 5000 BC, has been found in Pločnik and Belovode, Serbia. A mace head found in Turkey and dated to 5000 BC, once thought to be the oldest evidence, now appears to be hammered, native copper.

Copper–tin bronzes, harder, and more durable, were developed around 3500 BC, also in Asia Minor.

At present-day the direct product of copper smelters is anode copper which has a purity ranging from 98.5 to 99.8%. Anode copper can then be electrorefined to produce cathode copper with a purity of 99.99%.

=== Tin and lead ===
The earliest known cast lead beads were thought to be in the Çatalhöyük site in Anatolia (Turkey), and dated from about 6500 BC. However, recent research has discovered that this was not lead, but rather cerussite and galena, minerals rich in, but distinct from, lead.

Since the discovery happened several millennia before the invention of writing, there is no written record of how it was made. However, tin and lead can be smelted by placing the ores in a wood fire, leaving the possibility that the discovery may have occurred by accident. Recent scholarship however has called this find into question.

Lead is a common metal, but its discovery had relatively little impact in the ancient world. It is too soft to use for structural elements or weapons, though its high density relative to other metals makes it ideal for sling projectiles. However, since it was easy to cast and shape, workers in the classical world of Ancient Greece and Ancient Rome used it extensively to pipe and store water. They also used it as a mortar in stone buildings.

Tin was much less common than lead, is only marginally harder, and had even less impact by itself.

=== Early iron smelting ===
The earliest evidence for iron-making is a small number of iron fragments with the appropriate amounts of carbon admixture found in the Proto-Hittite layers at Kaman-Kalehöyük and dated to 2200–2000 BC. Souckova-Siegolová (2001) shows that iron implements were made in Central Anatolia in very limited quantities around 1800 BC and were in general use by elites, though not by commoners, during the New Hittite Empire (~1400–1200 BC).

Archaeologists have found indications of iron working in Ancient Egypt, somewhere between the Third Intermediate Period and 23rd Dynasty (ca. 1100–750 BC). Significantly though, they have found no evidence of iron ore smelting in any (pre-modern) period. Claims of very early instances of carbon steel in production about 2000 years ago (around 1st century AD.) in northwest Tanzania, based on complex preheating principles, are controversial.

Most early processes in Europe and Africa involved smelting iron ore in a bloomery, where the temperature is kept low enough so that the iron does not melt. This produces a spongy mass of iron called a bloom, which then must be consolidated with a hammer to produce wrought iron. Some of the earliest evidence to date for the bloomery smelting of iron is found at Tell Hammeh, Jordan, radiocarbon-dated to c. 930 BC.

=== Later iron smelting ===
From the medieval period, an indirect process began to replace the direct reduction in bloomeries. This used a blast furnace to make pig iron, which then had to undergo a further process to make forgeable bar iron. Processes for the second stage include fining in a finery forge. The blast furnace was first used by China, which had been using it since as early as 200 BC during the Qin dynasty. European blast furnaces began appearing in the 12th century AD in multiple locations such as Italy, Germany, and Sweden. Whether the European blast furnaces developed independently or ultimately derived from earlier Chinese technology remains uncertain. Both possibilities have been proposed, but direct evidence demonstrating transmission across Eurasia is lacking Puddling was also introduced in the Industrial Revolution.

Both processes are now obsolete, and wrought iron is now rarely made. Instead, mild steel is produced from a Bessemer converter or by other means including smelting reduction processes such as the Corex Process.

== Environmental and occupational health impacts ==
Smelting has serious effects on the environment, producing wastewater and slag and releasing such toxic metals as copper, silver, iron, cobalt, and selenium into the atmosphere. Smelters also release gaseous sulfur dioxide, contributing to acid rain, which acidifies soil and water.

The smelter in Flin Flon, Canada was one of the largest point sources of mercury in North America in the 20th century. Even after smelter releases were drastically reduced, landscape re-emission continued to be a major regional source of mercury. Lakes will likely receive mercury contamination from the smelter for decades, from both re-emissions returning as rainwater and leaching of metals from the soil.

=== Air pollution ===
Air pollutants generated by aluminium smelters include carbonyl sulfide, hydrogen fluoride, polycyclic compounds, lead, nickel, manganese, polychlorinated biphenyls, and mercury. Copper smelter emissions include arsenic, beryllium, cadmium, chromium, lead, manganese, and nickel. Lead smelters typically emit arsenic, antimony, cadmium, and various lead compounds.

=== Wastewater ===
Wastewater pollutants discharged by iron and steel mills includes gasification products such as benzene, naphthalene, anthracene, cyanide, ammonia, phenols, and cresols, together with a range of more complex organic compounds known collectively as polycyclic aromatic hydrocarbons (PAH). Treatment technologies include recycling of wastewater; settling basins, clarifiers and filtration systems for solids removal; oil skimmers and filtration; chemical precipitation and filtration for dissolved metals; carbon adsorption and biological oxidation for organic pollutants; and evaporation.

Pollutants generated by other types of smelters varies with the base metal ore. For example, aluminum smelters typically generate fluoride, benzo(a)pyrene, antimony, and nickel, as well as aluminum. Copper smelters typically discharge cadmium, lead, zinc, arsenic, and nickel, in addition to copper. Lead smelters may discharge antimony, asbestos, cadmium, copper, and zinc, in addition to lead.

=== Health impacts ===
Labourers working in the smelting industry have reported respiratory illnesses inhibiting their ability to perform the physical tasks demanded by their jobs.

=== Regulations ===
In the United States, the Environmental Protection Agency has published pollution control regulations for smelters.

- Air pollution standards under the Clean Air Act
- Water pollution standards (effluent guidelines) under the Clean Water Act.

== See also ==
- Cast iron
- Clinker
- Copper extraction techniques
- Cupellation
- Ellingham diagram, useful in predicting the conditions under which an ore reduces to its metal
- Lead smelting
- Metallurgy in pre-Columbian America
- Metallurgy
- Pyrometallurgy
- Wrought iron
- Zinc smelting

== Bibliography ==
- Pleiner, R. (2000) Iron in Archaeology. The European Bloomery Smelters, Praha, Archeologický Ústav Av Cr.
- Veldhuijzen, H.A. (2005) Technical Ceramics in Early Iron Smelting. The Role of Ceramics in the Early First Millennium BC Iron Production at Tell Hammeh (Az-Zarqa), Jordan. In: Prudêncio, I.Dias, I. and Waerenborgh, J.C. (Eds.) Understanding People through Their Pottery; Proceedings of the 7th European Meeting on Ancient Ceramics (Emac '03). Lisboa, Instituto Português de Arqueologia (IPA).
- Veldhuijzen, H.A. and Rehren, Th. (2006) Iron Smelting Slag Formation at Tell Hammeh (Az-Zarqa), Jordan. In: Pérez-Arantegui, J. (Ed.) Proceedings of the 34th International Symposium on Archaeometry, Zaragoza, 3–7 May 2004. Zaragoza, Institución «Fernando el Católico» (C.S.I.C.) Excma. Diputación de Zaragoza.
