= Matte (metallurgy) =

Term for the liquid generated by smelting non-ferrous metals, such as copper

Matte is a term used in the field of pyrometallurgy given to the molten metal sulfide phases typically formed during smelting of copper, nickel, and other base metals. Typically, a matte is the phase in which the principal metal being extracted is recovered prior to a final reduction process (usually converting) to produce blister copper. The matte may also collect some valuable minor constituents such as noble metals, minor base metals, selenium or tellurium. Mattes may also be used to collect impurities from a metal phase, such as in the case of antimony smelting. Molten mattes are insoluble in both slag and metal phases. This insolubility, combined with differences in specific gravities between mattes, slags, and metals, allows for separation of the molten phases.
