= Flash smelting =

Smelting process for sulfur-containing ores

Development of flash smelting in the copper industry, related to the number of smelters using this technology.

Flash smelting (Finnish: Liekkisulatus, literally "flame-smelting") is a smelting process for sulfur-containing ores, which are powdered, mixed with oxygen, and then ignited on discharge from a nozzle. Chalcopyrite, a copper ore, can be smelted this way.

The process was developed by Outokumpu in Finland and first applied at the Harjavalta plant in 1949 for smelting copper ore. It has also been adapted for nickel and lead production.

A second flash smelting system was developed by the International Nickel Company ('INCO') and has a different concentrate feed design compared to the Outokumpu flash furnace. The Inco flash furnace has end-wall concentrate injection burners and a central waste gas off-take, while the Outokumpu flash furnace has a water-cooled reaction shaft at one end of the vessel and a waste gas off-take at the other end. While the INCO flash furnace at Sudbury was the first commercial use of oxygen flash smelting, fewer smelters use the INCO flash furnace than the Outokumpu flash furnace.

== Process ==
Flash smelting with oxygen-enriched air (the 'reaction gas') makes use of the energy contained in the concentrate to supply most of the energy required by the furnaces. The concentrate must be dried before it is injected into the furnaces and, in the case of the Outokumpu process, some of the furnaces use an optional heater to warm the reaction gas typically to 100–450 °C.

The reactions in the flash smelting furnaces produce copper matte, iron oxides and sulfur dioxide. The reacted particles fall into a bath at the bottom of the furnace, where the iron oxides react with fluxes, such as silica and limestone, to form a slag.

In most cases, the slag can be discarded, perhaps after some cleaning, and the matte is further treated in converters to produce blister copper. In some cases where the flash furnaces are fed with concentrate containing a sufficiently high copper content, the concentrate is converted directly to blister in a single Outokumpu furnace and further converting is unnecessary.

The sulfur dioxide produced by flash smelting is typically captured in a sulfuric acid plant, removing the major environmental effect of smelting.

Outotec, formerly the technology division of Outokumpu, now holds Outokumpu's patents to the technology and licenses it worldwide.

INCO was acquired by Brazil's Vale in 2006.

Outokumpu flash furnace, mainly designed for copper smelting

Inco flash furnace, mainly designed for nickel smelting (also efficient for copper smelting)

Kivcet flash furnace, mainly designed for lead smelting (also efficient for copper and zinc smelting)

== See also ==
- Copper extraction techniques
