= Los Colorados mine =

Iron mine in Chile

Los Colorados
- Location within Atacama Region Location within Chile
- Location: Atacama Region, Chile; 28°17′45.47″S 70°48′22.87″W
- Products: Iron
- Opened: 1997
- Company: Compañía Minera del Pacífico

Los Colorados is an open-pit iron mine in northern Chile about 45 km northeast of the port of Huasco. The ore of the mine is one of various iron oxide-apatite (IOA) ores that are part of the north-south Chilean Iron Belt. The mine opened in 1997 and in 2021 it had a production of 2,559,000 metric tons of iron. It is owned by Compañía Minera del Pacífico (CMP). The mine is considered a replacement for El Algarrobo a nearby mine that became exhausted of profitable ore in the 1990s. Its planned cut-off grade in the 1990s was 30% Fe. Currently the mine feeds iron ore to the pelletizing plant Planta de Pellets at the coast in Huasco for the manufacture of iron pellets. It produces annually 4.5 million metric tons of pellets. Besides this, Los Colorados mine feeds the inland Planta Magnetita in Tierra Amarilla (which also receives tailings from Candelaria). From Planta Magnetita ore concentrate is transported in a pipeline for 120 km to the port of Punta Totoralillo.

In 2025 the mine has submitted an environmental impact assessment for approval by authorities to expand its produce of iron pre-concentrate from 9.1 to 9.8 million tonnes.

The mine was formerly owned by Compañia Minera Huasco, a joint venture of CMP (50%) and Mitsubishi Corporation (50%). In 2010 Compañia Minera Huasco was folded into CMP and Mitsubishi Corporation obtained a 25% ownership of CMP; 15.9% by the folding and 9.1% by capital injection to CMP.

== Bibliography ==
- Millán, Augusto (1999). Historia de la minería del hierro en Chile (in Spanish). Santiago de Chile: Editorial Universitaria. ISBN 956-11-1499-2.
