= Boquerón Chañar =

Iron mine in Chile

- Location within Atacama Region Location within Chile
- Location: Atacama Region, Chile; 28°04′10″S 70°42′00″W
- Products: Iron
- Company: CORFO

Boquerón Chañar is a closed iron mine and iron ore deposit in the Chilean Iron Belt in the southern reaches of the Atacama Desert. The deposit lies near the city of Vallenar, in Atacama Region, Chile. The deposit is currently owned by Chilean state organization CORFO. It is thought to hosts reserves of 300 million metric tons of iron. Boquerón Chañar was last active in the 1960s. A plan to open the mine again, now in synergy with the nearby mine of El Algarrobo and Planta de Pellets at the coast, was shelved in 1974 by the government.

The ores of Boquerón Chañar are grouped in eight orebodies with ore grades of 57% iron and 0.18% phosphorus located 250 to 1000 meters below ground. These bodies make up a reserve of 163 million tons.

The ore is made of magnetite with gangue minerals of actinolite, apatite and scapolite. It is classified as a small deposit by the National Geology and Mining Service.

Since CORFO took control the ore deposit and mine it has been at tender various times. In 1982 CORFO put the mine on an international tender but received no offer. In 1990, Compañía Minera del Pacífico (CMP) which operates Planta de Pellets and Puerto Guacolda II, both near the mine, made an offer to purchase the mine to CORFO but it was turned down. The company Minera Hierro Paposo sought to acquire the deposit in 2007 after it was put to tender in 2006 but efforts were abandoned in face of the fall of international iron prices during 2008 economic crisis. More recently, CORFO has conditioned the sale of Boquerón Chañar to the export of iron to produce "green steel" at the Huachipato steel mill in Talcahuano. The development of the deposit is planned to be put into a tender open for international companies in 2025.

== Bibliography ==
- Millán, Augusto (1999). Historia de la minería del hierro en Chile (in Spanish). Santiago de Chile: Editorial Universitaria. ISBN 956-11-1499-2.
