= Copper mining in Chile =

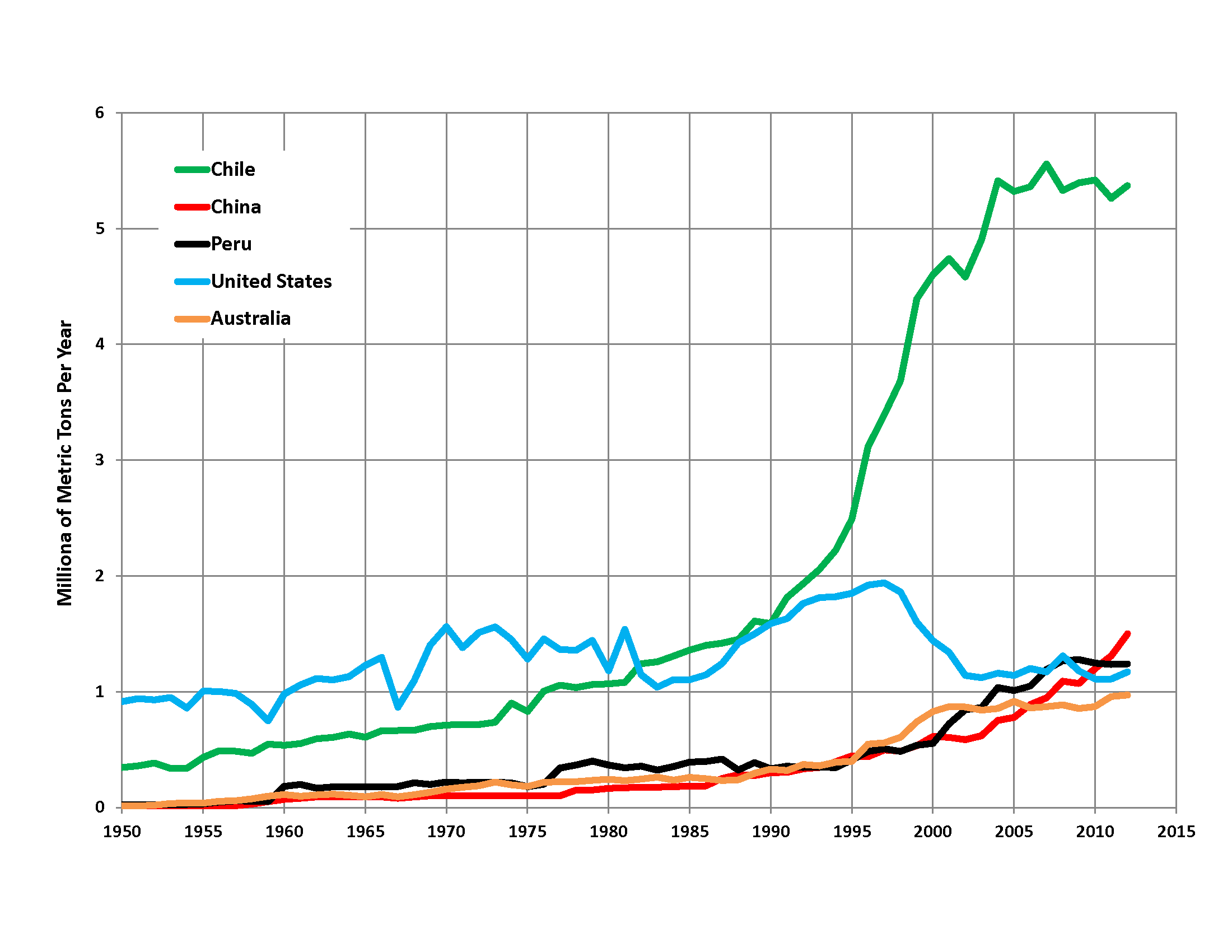
Production trends in the top five copper-producing countries, 1950-2012

Location of the five largest copper mines by copper production and the two active custom copper smelters of Chile. Note that more copper smelters exist but these are usually integrated within the mines.

Chile is the world's largest producer of copper and has been so uninterruptedly since 1983. This activity provides a substantial part of the Chilean state's revenue: slightly less than 6% in 2020, with state-owned copper company Codelco alone generating 2.6% of state revenue. (Note: From 2001 to 2014 Codelco alone stood for 10% of the state's income.)

Mining of copper in Chile is done chiefly on large and giant low-grade porphyry copper deposits which are primarily mined by the following companies; Codelco, BHP, Antofagasta Minerals, Anglo American and Glencore. Together these companies stood for 83.6% of the copper output in Chile in 2019 and many copper mining companies are joint ventures involving one at least one of these. Medium-scale mining in Chile, which focuses mainly on copper, produced about 4.5% of the copper mined in the country from 2017 to 2021. Copper is also the main product of small-scale mining in Chile, with about 95% of small-scale miners working in copper mining. (Note: The fact that most small-scale mining in Chile focus on copper, which means handling large volumes difficult to smuggle or hide has been thought to be a contributing factor to the low levels of illegal mining in Chile.) One estimate puts the number of active copper mines in Chile in 2023 at 67. In the 2015–2025 period 86–91% of the annual copper production in Chile has been mined in open pits and the remainder in underground mines.

The amount of copper mined in Chile has remained relatively constant at 5,212 to 5,831 thousand tons of copper yearly in the 2005–2024 period, but due to increased copper mining outside Chile the country's share of the world's produce has dropped from 36% to 24% in the same period. Also in the same period 36% to 72% of the gold and more than half of the silver produced annually in Chile was a by-product of copper mining. The grade of copper ores mined in Chile has diminished since 2000 due to depletion and increased profitability of low-grade ore due to high copper prices. (Note: Average copper ore grades in Chile were of 1.27% in 2000 and of 0.86% in 2011, and for copper ores to be lixiviated grades went from 0.97% to 0.69% in the same period.) The amount of water consumed and greenhouse gases emitted per ton copper produced has also diminished since 2001.

Most copper mined in Chile is exported to China. Far behind China, other important export destinations for Chilean copper are Japan, United States and South Korea. In the 2020s unrefined copper concentrate have stood for about 5/8 of the value of Chilean copper exports, while copper cathode refined in Chile stands for the remaining 3/8.

The governance of copper mining in Chile is done by non-overlapping bodies; COCHILCO, ENAMI, the National Geology and Mining Service (SERNAGEOMIN) and the Ministry of Mining. SONAMI and Consejo Minero are corporate guilds of mining companies in Chile.

== Largest copper mines in Chile ==
Largest copper mines in Chile by production
Mine	Type	Tons of copper (× 1000)	Year of production	Year of opening	Projected year of closure	Owners	Sources
Collahuasi	Open-pit	▼558.6	2024	1999	2106	Glencore (44%); Anglo American (44%); JCR (12%)	
Chuquicamata	Underground	▲289.0	2024	1915	2058	Codelco	
Escondida	Open-pit	▲1277.5	2024	1990	2078	BHP (57.5%); Rio Tinto (30%); JECO Corporation (10%); JECO 2 Ltd (2.5%)	
Los Pelambres	Open-pit	▲331.2	2024	1999	2035	Antofagasta Minerals	
El Teniente	Underground	▲356.4	2024	1908	2072	Codelco	

== Geology ==
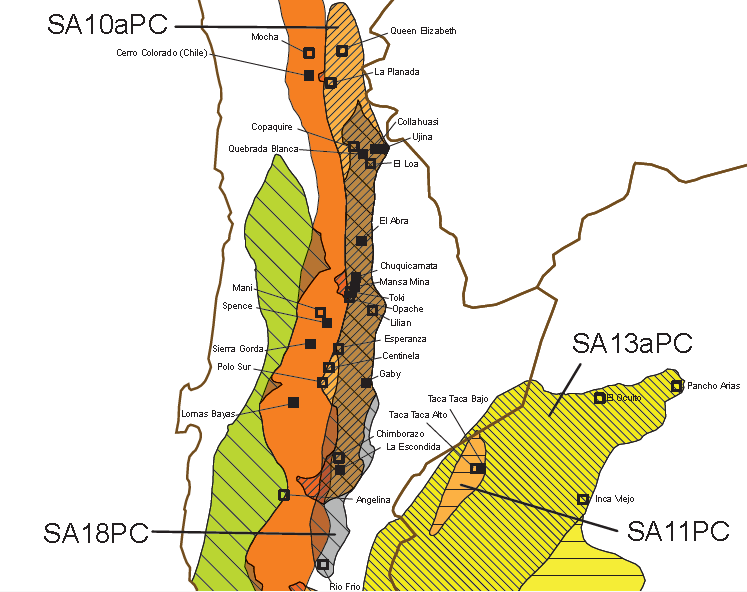
Map showing the location of the large copper mines (filled squares) and prospects (empty squares) in northernmost Chile as of 2008. Paleocene-Eocene belt in orange, Eocene-Oligocene belt in hatched beige, and Cretaceous belt in hatched green.

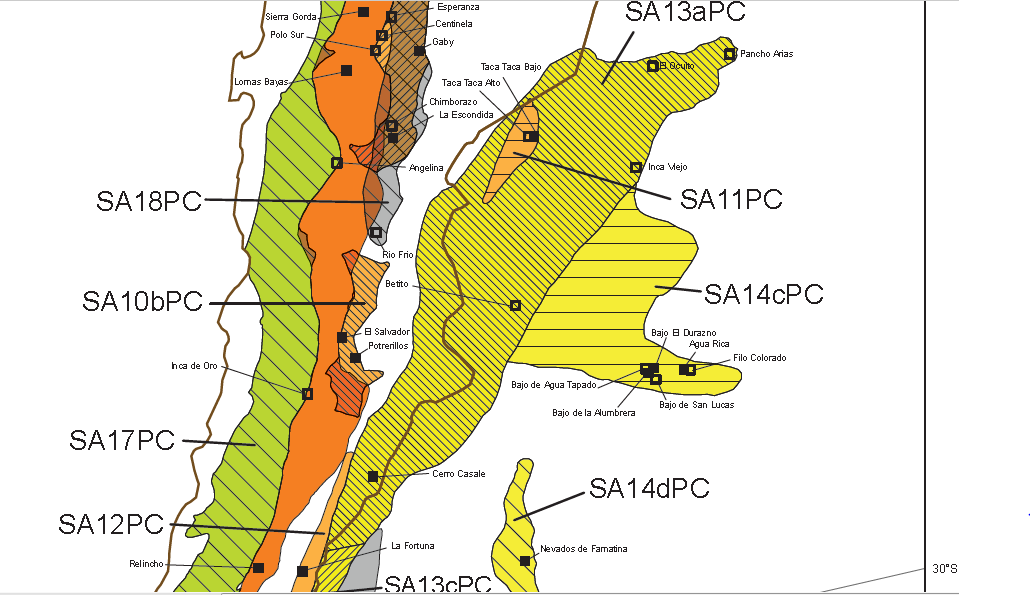
Map of north-central Chile.

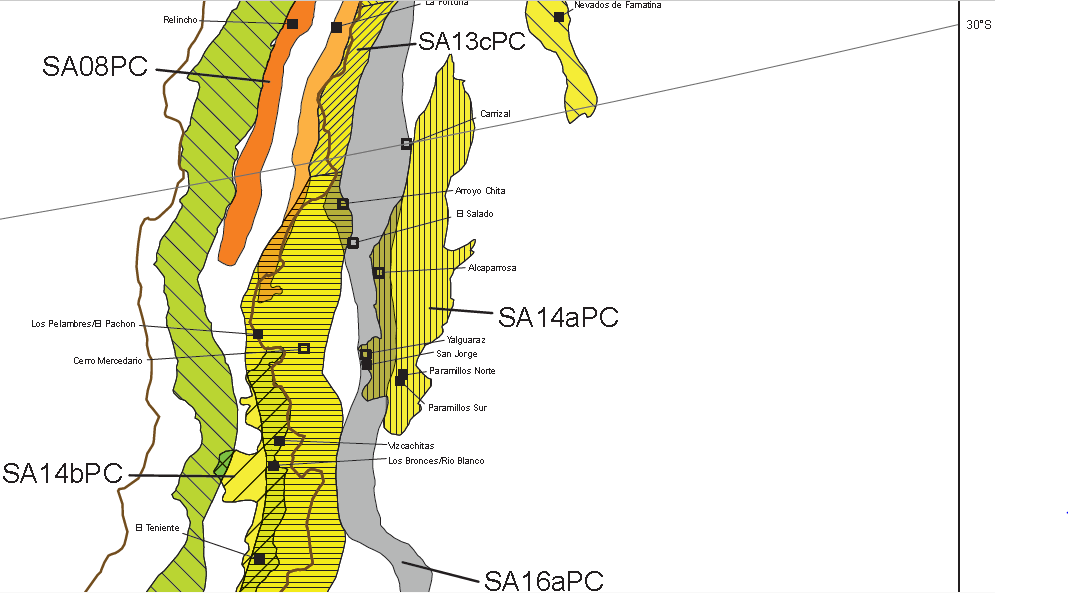
Map of north-central Chile showing the location of the Middle Miocene-Early Pliocene belt with horizontally hatched yellow. In this belt lie the Los Pelambres and El Teniente copper mines.

Mining of copper in Chile is done chiefly on large and giant low-grade porphyry copper deposits. Copper deposits of similar age in Chile occur in elongated geographical patterns which are termed metallogenic belts. Five metallogenic copper belts have been identified by geologists in Chile. The main two of these are the Late Eocene-Oligocene belt in the far north and the Middle Miocene-Early Pliocene belt in north-central Chile with the first one hosting most copper resources. The other metallogenic belts containing porphyry copper deposits are a discontinuous Cretaceous belt, the Paleocene belt and the Early-Middle Miocene belt, both of which are located in northern Chile. All these ores formed episodically during the span of the Andean orogeny except for the Jurassic when the orogeny was not contractional but extensional. Within the Late Eocene-Oligocene belt the following copper deposits and mines, from north to south, are aligned around Domeyko Fault: Collahuasi, Quebrada Blanca, El Abra, Radomiro Tomic, Chuquicamata, Escondida, El Salvador and Potrerillos. In the Middle Miocene-Early Pliocene belt the main deposits and mines are Los Pelambres, Los Bronces and El Teniente. (Note: When not considering the other three belts, these two belts are sometimes referred to as the Paleogene belt and the Neogene belt.)

It has been proposed that the giant porphyry deposits of the Eocene-Oligocene belt formed in a context of oblique subduction that had an associated magmatism of adakitic character, scant volcanism and attenuated escape of SO_{2}. Ore-forming magmatism has in this context been termed "closed porphyry systems" that had limited degassing that would have led to the formation of highly oxidized deposits rich in sulphur. In contrast, deposits of the Paleocene–Early Eocene belt such as Lomas Bayas and Spence are smaller and associated to more orthogonal subduction and ordinary calc-alkaline non-adakitic magmatism that included plenty of volcanism.

Various authors have indicated that intersections between continent-scale traverse fault zones and arc-parallel structures are associated with porphyry formation. In Chile this has been pointed out to be the case of Escondida, Los Bronces and El Teniente porphyry copper deposits each of which lies at the intersection of two fault systems.

A few copper deposits in Chile are labelled "exotic" as they originate from kilometer-scale lateral migration of copper-rich fluids originating in porphyry copper deposits.

== Ore processing, refining and smelting ==
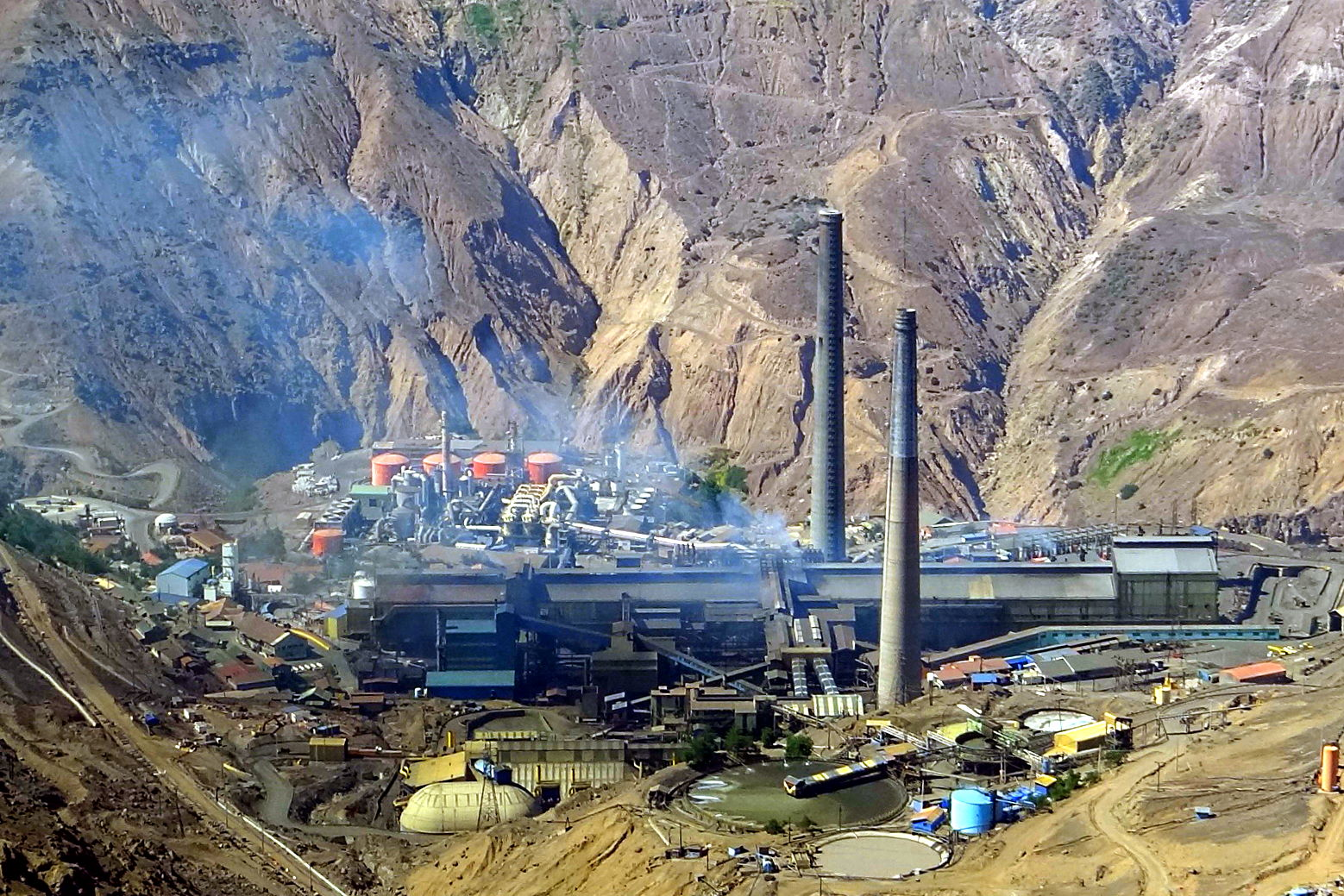
View of Codelco's Caletones smelter as of 2015 that serves El Teniente mine.

The main product of Chilean copper mining is copper concentrate (i.e. the stage of the ore before smelting). In 2024, this represented 50.9% of the value of Chilean mining products exports, while refined copper made up 33%, down from 34.9% in 2023. This reduction follows a long-term trend of diminishing smelting capacity in Chile. (Note: In the 2013-2023 period the copper smelting capacity in China and Zambia has increased while the capacity in Chile and the United States has decreased. China has by far the largest capacity of copper smelting with over half of the world's total. Besides the previously mentioned countries, other countries with a significant installed cathode production capacity as of 2023 were (as percentages of the world total) Japan (8%), Russia (5%), Poland (3-4%) and Bulgaria (3-4%).)

Final processing is as of 2025 done in five copper smelters, some of which rank among the world's largest in term of capacity. Some large copper mines have their own smelters, but there are also the custom copper smelters (Note: A custom copper smelter is one receiving or open to receive ores from multiple mines. Thus, these smelters tend to be less fine-tuned than smelters integrated with specific mines. Custom smelters tend also to be located at strategic locations, such as near port facilities or at important crossroads in mining districts.) of Altonorte in La Negra and Paipote near Copiapó, operated by Glencore and ENAMI respectively.

Since the 1990s no new copper smelters have been built in Chile. Following the closure of Codelco's Fundición Ventanas in central Chile in 2023, there have been public discussions on building a large new copper smelter in Chile. The building of a new smelter is supported by the Ministry of Mining which aims for a capacity to produce 800,000 tonnes of copper. Antofagasta Region and Atacama Region have been proposed by Chilean industry experts as viable replacement sites. Others have argued for keeping smelting in the Valparaíso Region, given the existence of nearby mines. While some argue the replacement plant should be near the coast, the inland sites of Chuquicamata and El Salvador have also been proposed as alternatives. The president of the National Mining Society (Sonami), Diego Hernández, estimates the construction period for a new smelter plant to be 5 to 7 years. A 2024 study identified Antofagasta Region as the best place for a new copper smelter, due to logistical advantages and an existing and expandable supply of copper concentrate from nearby mines.

Following a chimney collapse in Codelco's Fundición Potrerillos in June 2025 there have been calls to close this smelter.

The mineral composition of ore concentrates produced by Chilean copper mines vary. For example, the concentrates of Escondida contain about 4% chalcopyrite, 35% chalcocite and 46% pyrite, while the concentrates of El Teinente have about 42% chalcopyrite, 19% chalcocite, 25% pyrite and 3% pyrrhotite.

== Water use ==
Water consumption of copper mining in Chile
Year	Average m^{3}/s	% Recycled	% Freshwater	% Sea water
2023	73.0	74	17	9
2018	62.3	72	22	6
2013	46.1	70	28	2

There is a strong competition for water resources among mining companies and local communities in Atacama Desert. For mines that are high in the Andes there are logistical difficulties in the use of sea water, in addition to increased probabilities of extreme weather events that may disrupt water supply. By the mid-2010s mining stood for 66% of the freshwater consumption in Antofagasta Region and 10% of it in Atacama Region which is a region with significant agriculture. In the more southern and less arid Coquimbo and Valparaíso regions mining stand for 5 and 6.5% of freshwater consumption.

Copper mining in Chile consumed an average of 73 m^{3}/s in 2023, a 58% increase since ten years prior. Most water used in copper mining is reported to be recycled, while the remaining is freshwater and sea water. As of 2023, 69% of sea water used in mining is desalinated. In copper mining freshwater consumption is derived on roughly equal parts from aquifers and surface waters as of 2023. The Cerro Colorado mine closed in 2023 in face of the non-renewal of its water extraction licence from the Pampa Lagunillas Aquifer. The water extraction of Cerro Colorado mine impacted bofedal-type wetlands on the surface of the aquifer leading to shrinking of the vegetated areas. This was reportedly the largest mine closure in Chile since the 2002 closure of El Indio mine. In a similar case, Zaldívar mine avoided premature mine closure in 2025 when Chile's Environmental Assessment Service extended continental water use rights until 2028 following earlier complains against its use of aquifer water by indigenous Atacameño people.

The concentration process and the disposal of tailings stand together for about 3/4 of the water consumed by mining. Hydrometallurgy uses 11%, and dust control and mine water stand together for 7% of the water consumption.

In the 2001–2015 period mill plant concentrators have become more efficient by requiring less water for the same amount of processed mineral. However the increasingly lower ore grades processed have led to more ore being processed in order to maintain production levels which have hence raised water demand in the flotation facilities.

Material that is discarded from the concentration process of copper in Chile, and worldwide, usually ends up in tailings dams. The discarded material is made up of fine particles slushed away in a mix with usually 70% of water and 30% of solids. Some more modern techniques can manage to deposit tailings with only 15% of water. Medium-scale mining in Chile has been suggested to be in favourable conditions to apply environmental techniques such as dry tailings relative to large-scale mining.

== Energy consumption ==
Despite technology that improves the energy efficiency energy demands in copper mining have risen and are expected as of 2020 to continue to rise. As of 2025 Chile has the region's highest electricity prices for mining companies (11.1 $US per kWh) and also, on average, the region's highest milling cost per unit copper produced (2.4 to 3.0 $US per metric ton processed).

The merge of the electrics grids of Sistema Interconectado del Norte Grande and Sistema Interconectado Central into a new grid called Sistema Eléctrico Nacional in 2019 diminished indirect greenhouse gas emissions per ton of copper produced. This effect was caused as most mines had previously relied on Sistema Interconectado del Norte Grande which was based on fossil fuel, hence for the Chilean economy as whole there was no decrease in greenhouse gas emissions with the merger of the grids.

== Tailings ==
Copper mining in Chile produces large amounts of tailings. After United States, Chile is the country with most tailings dam failures in the 20th century and also in the 21st century. Small and medium-scale copper mining are thought to be in a good position to implement dry tailings.

Planta Magnetita near Copiapó processes tailings from the copper mine of Candelaria creating iron ore concentrate. This has been called the "largest circular economy project in mining in Chile" by Revista Minera Crisol and El Desconcierto.

== History ==
Copper has been mined for centuries at Chuquicamata, as evidenced by the 1899 discovery of the "Copper Man," a mummy dated to c. 550 A.D. The mummy was found in an ancient mine shaft, apparently trapped by a rockfall. About 74 km northeast of Copiapó in Viña del Cerro the Incas had one of their largest mining and metallurgy centres at Qullasuyu. There is evidence of gold, silver and copper metallurgy at the site, including the production of bronze.

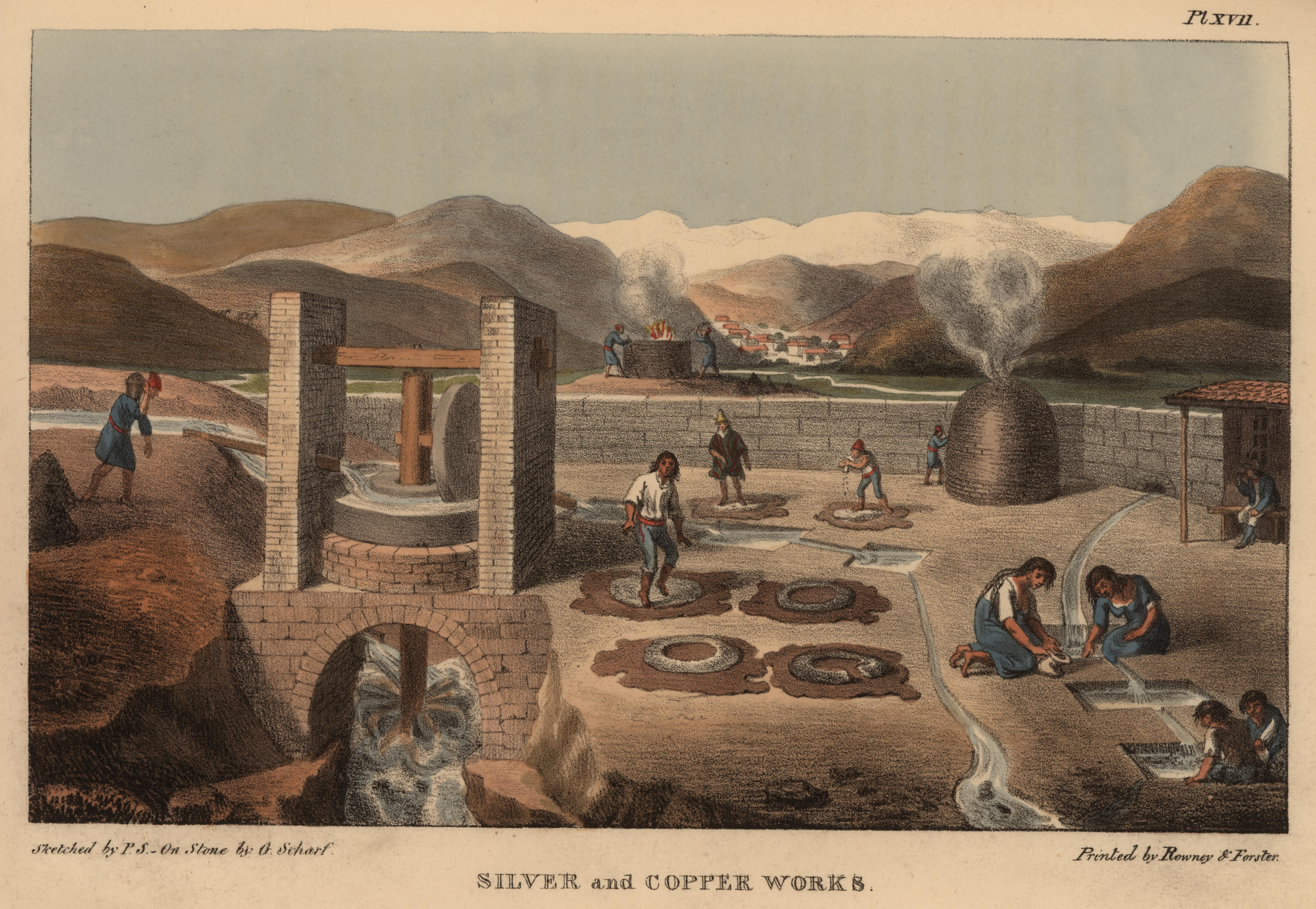
Representation of Peter Schmidtmeyer and George Johann Scharf of the processing of Chilean copper and silver in 1820–1821.

Chilean copper mining of high-grade oxidized copper minerals and melting with charcoal produced 80,000 to 85,000 tons of copper in the 1541–1810 period.

=== Reverberatory furnace revolution ===
The introduction of reverberatory furnaces to Chile around 1830 by Charles Saint Lambert revolutionized Chilean copper mining. The use of mineral coal instead charcoal in the reverberatory furnaces introduced by Saint Lambert also meant there was not longer a dependency on the scarce firewood to be found on Atacama Desert and its surrounding semi-arid areas as was the case with earlier smelting technology. The expansion of copper mining also benefited from improvements of transport caused by the development of railroads and steam navigation. In 1851, Copiapó –a city in the middle of a copper and silver district– was connected by railroad to Caldera, its principal port of export. The expansion of railroads continued and all the main mining districts of copper were connected by railroad by the 1870s.

Prospector José Tomás Urmeneta discovered rich orebodies in Tamaya in 1850, and this became one of Chile's main copper mines. All of this enabled Chile to supply 18% of the copper produced worldwide in the 19th century, and from the 1850s to the 1870s the country was the world's top producer. In some years Chile's copper production made up about 60% of the world's output, and its export tariffs made up more than half the state's income.

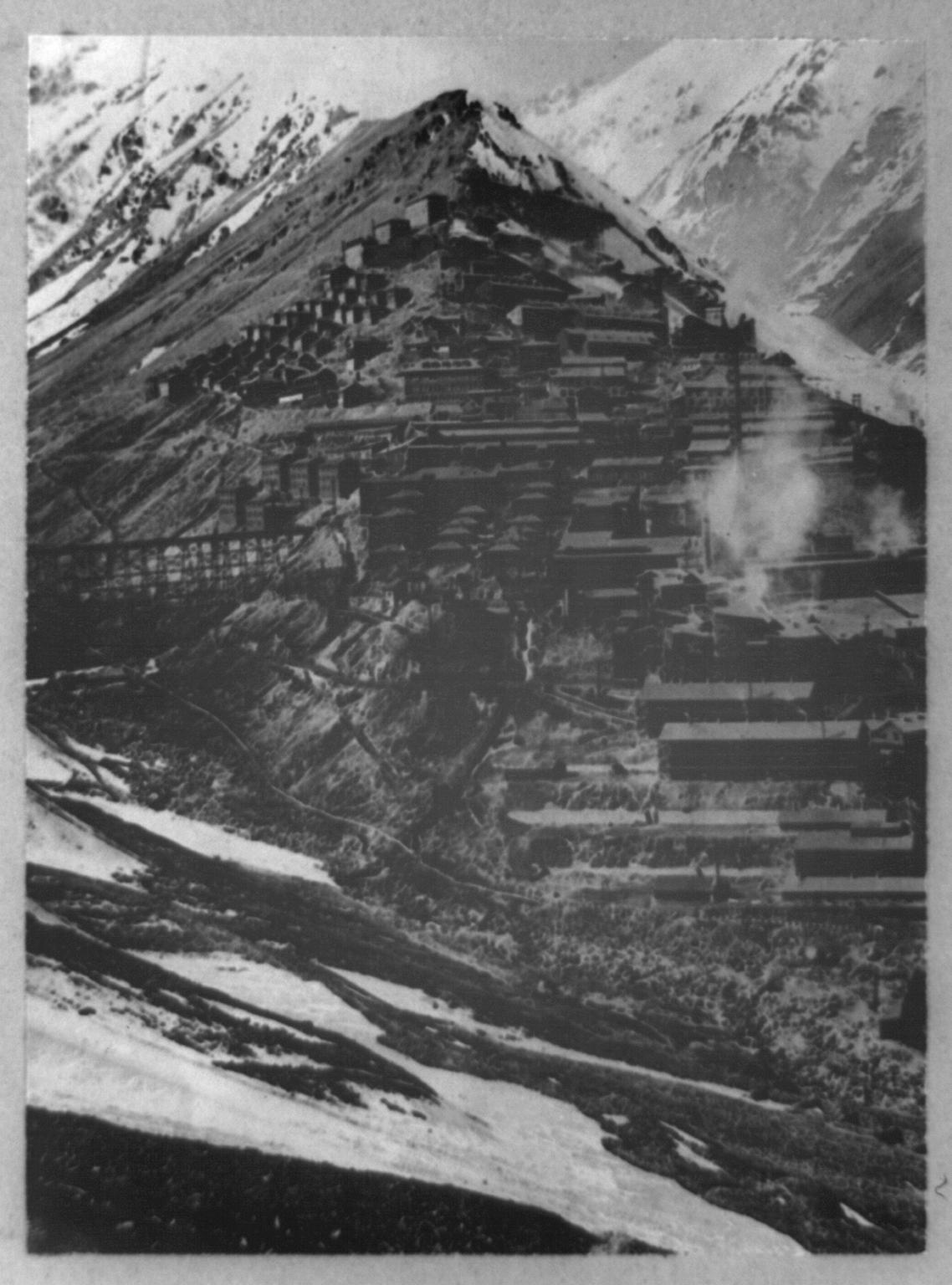
View of Sewell, a town created to serve El Teniente during the early days of the large-scale copper mining.

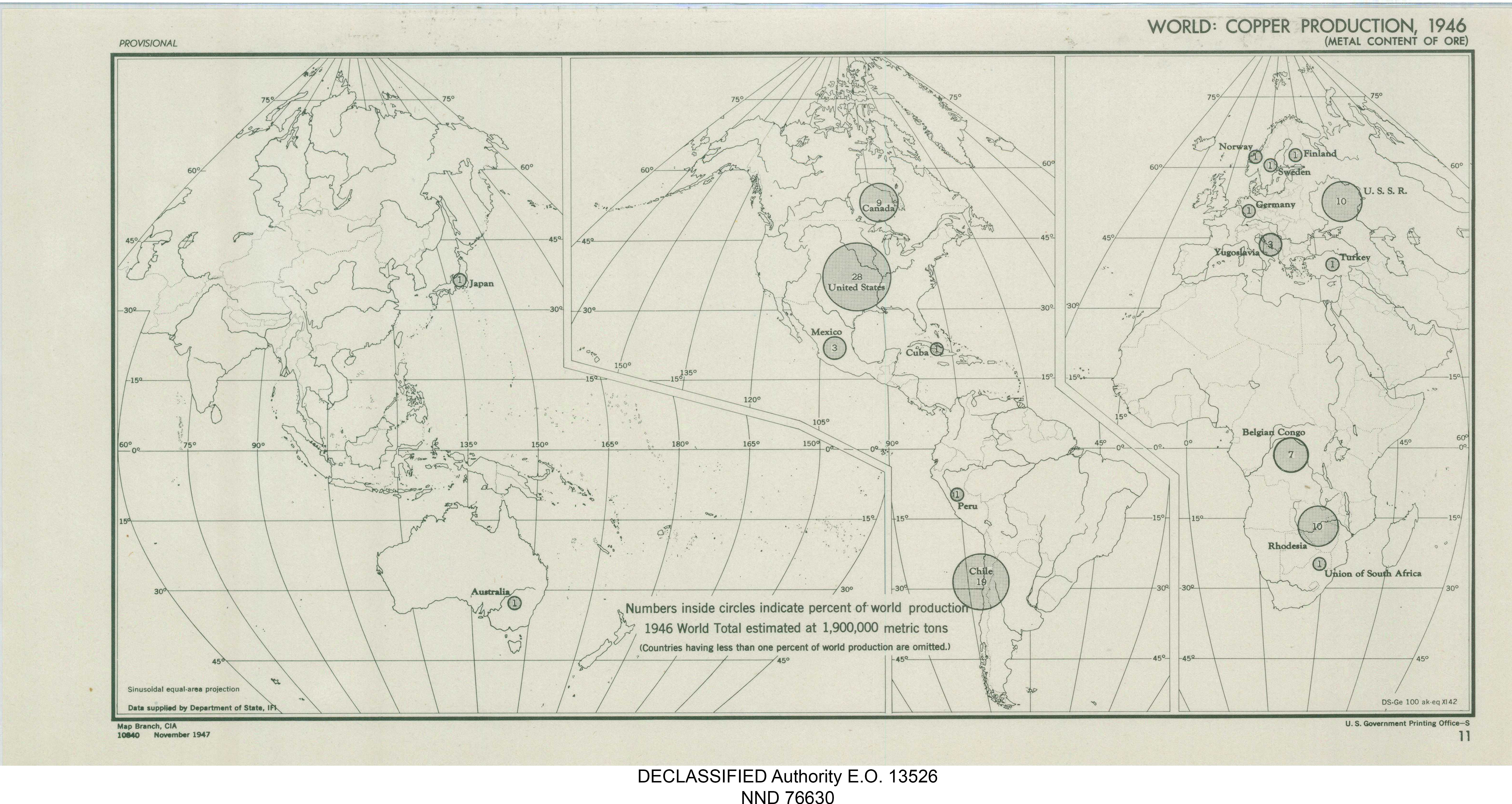
World copper production, 1946. Click to enlarge.

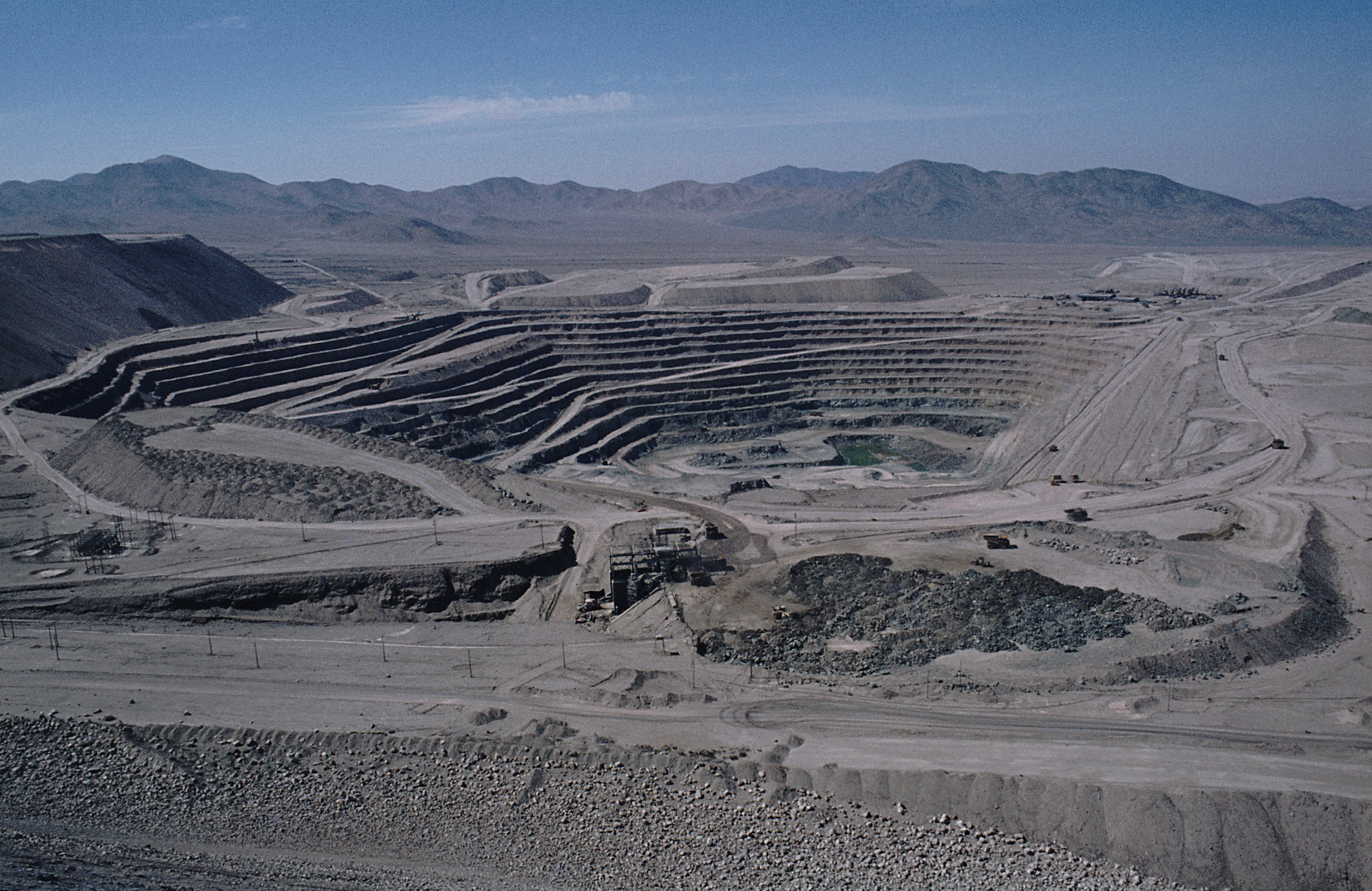
View of Chuquicamata mine in 1983. For most of the 20th century this was the most productive copper mine in Chile.

=== Temporary decline ===
By the late 19th century the Chilean mining industry once again lagged behind technological developments elsewhere (Note: These developments included mineral processing by flotation and leaching, increased mechanization and the scaling-up of open-pit mining.) contributing to the drop of its share of the world production to 5–6% in the 1890s. Similar shares continued in the 1900s and 1910s, reaching a low of 4.3% in 1914. Concurrent with technological changes was also a 49% decline in the price of copper between 1873 and 1895. The decline in mining empoverished communities in the provinces of Coquimbo and Atacama.

Up to the 1940s and 1950s there was also a notable lack of major copper exploration efforts by large mining companies that relied on purchasing prospects already known from the activity of small-scale miners and pirquineros.

Chuquicamata, which was to become Chiles largest copper mine in the 20th century, had some mining activity in this downturn period. In this locality Chilean and English companies mined brochantite veins from 1879 to 1912.

=== Large-scale mining era ===
Modern large-scale copper mining in Chile emerged though technological transfer and capital investment from the United States in three mines: El Teniente (1904), Chuquicamata (1912), and Potrerillos (1920). The Guggenheims that owned El Teniente sold 95% of the shares of this mine to Kennecot Copper in 1915, and then in 1923 sold 51% of their share in Chuquicamata to Anaconda Copper. With the onset of the Great Depression in 1929 copper prices plummeted and unemployment among miners in Chile became rife. An earthquake and tsunami in 1922 destroyed much mining and metallurgical infrastructure in the provinces of Coquimbo and Atacama but spared the emergent Chuquicamata and El Teniente mines which lay to far north, respectively south, of the epicenter.

After the United States entered the Second World War in 1941 a cap was imposed on copper prices, impacting mining and generating large revenue losses for Chile. During the Korean War (1950–1953) copper mining in Chile was again affected by price caps imposed by the United States. The Chilean state overhauled its relationship to foreign large-scale copper mining with its Ley de Nuevo Trato law of 1955. This new law sought to reward investments in copper mining by offering decreasing taxes if production increased. Despite this overhaul, new mining taxes were added in 1961.

On June 19, 1945, The Smoke Tragedy left 355 workers dead in the underground copper mine of El Teniente.

The existing institutions supporting small-scale mining —Empresa Nacional de Fundiciones and Caja de Crédito Minero— were reorganized in 1960 into the new state-owned company ENAMI. This new company came to own two custom smelters, Paipote which it inherited and Ventanas which it inaugurated in 1964.

In 1969 Chile negotiated for the state-owned company Codelco the purchase of a 51% stake of each of the subsidiary companies of Anaconda Copper operating in the mines Chuquicamata and El Salvador. In the same negotiation Chile was promised the purchase of the remaining 49% of the stakes in December 1972.

International investments in copper mining concentrated in Chile in the 1980s and 1990s, as copper mining in other countries faced problems like political instability (Peru), increased environmental requirements (developed countries) and overall disinterest in foreign investment in a nationalized mining industry (Zaire, Zambia). After Mitsubishi Corporation's 1985 investment in Minera Escondida investments of Japanese capital became common in Chilean copper mining.

In March 1991 Escondida –which was to become the world's most productive copper mine– was officially inaugurated.

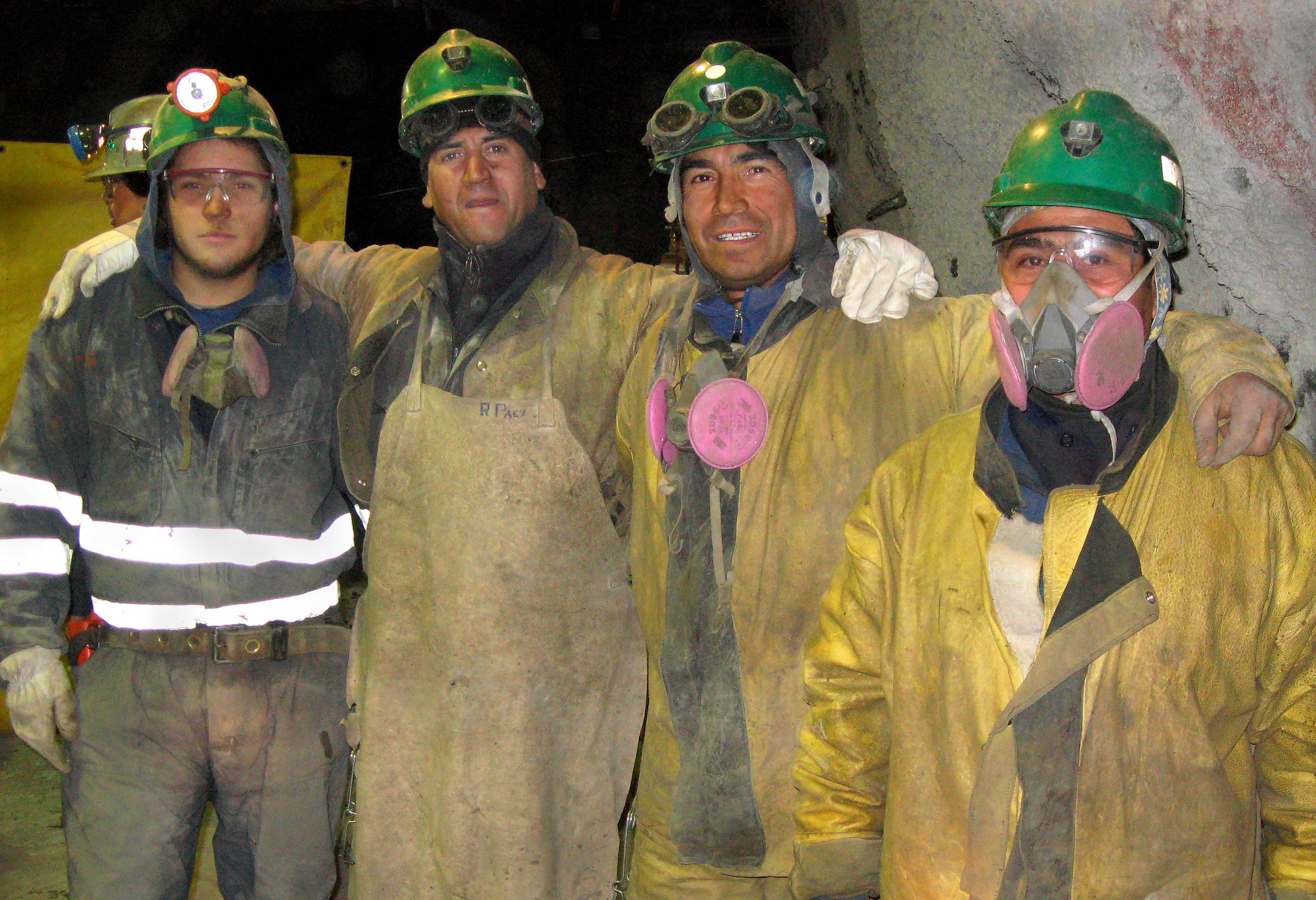
Chilean underground copper miners in 2007.

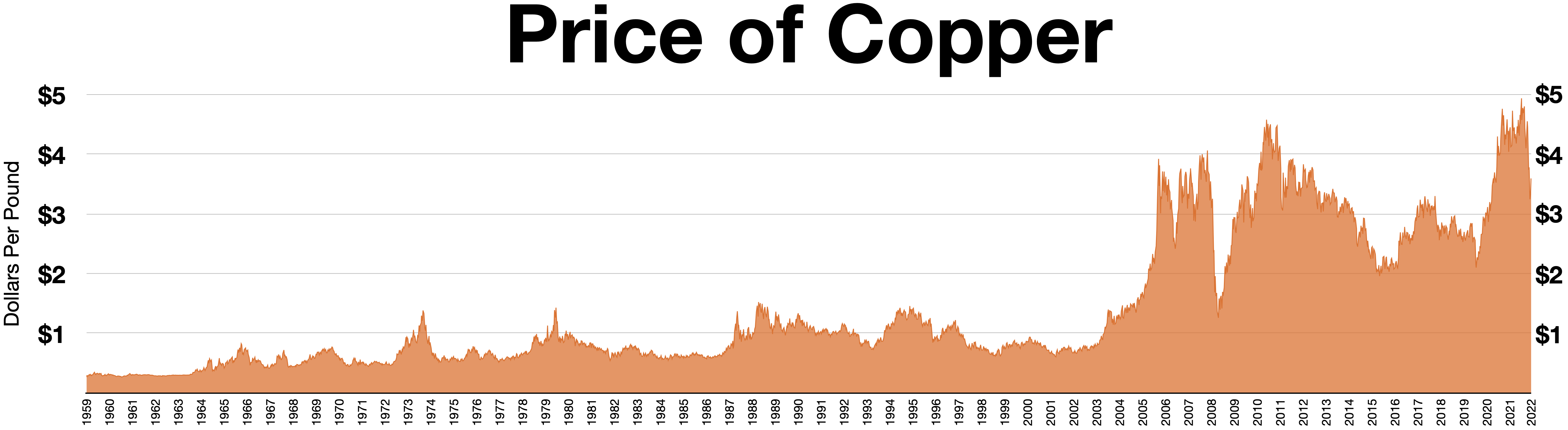
Price of copper 1959-2022

In 1987 Chile introduced the Copper Stabilization Fund, a fund aimed to stabilize the income of Codelco given the volatility of copper prices.

While since at least 2004 the production levels of copper of Codelco have stagnated or declined, yet the company made large gains during the 2000s commodities boom. Hence, from 2001 to 2014 Codelco alone stood for 10% of the state's income, while in 2020 it stood for 2.6% of the state income. Artisan miners known as pirquineros also made considerable profits albeit some found it difficult to reskill to gold mining after copper prices fell in 2008.

== Bibliography ==
- Camus, Francisco (2005). "La minería y la evolución de la exploración en Chile". In Lagos, Gustavo (ed.). Minería y desarrollo (in Spanish). Santiago, Chile: Ediciones Universidad Católica de Chile. pp. 229–270. ISBN 956-14-0844-9.
- Ceballos, Juan Ignacio; Tilton, John (2005). "Análisis del Fondo de Compensación del Cobre Chile". In Lagos, Gustavo (ed.). Minería y desarrollo (in Spanish). Santiago, Chile: Ediciones Universidad Católica de Chile. pp. 295–318. ISBN 956-14-0844-9.
- COCHILCO (2024). Informe Consumo de Agua en la Minería del Cobre: Actualización al año 2023 (PDF) (Report) (in Spanish).
- Guajardo, Juan Carlos; Marañón, Matías; Ciudad, Juan Cristóbal; del Mauro, Bastián; Nicolás, Muñóz; Fiorella, Ulloa (2023). Caracterización de la mediana minería en Chile [Characterization of medium-scale mining in Chile] (PDF) (Report) (in Spanish). Centro de Estudios y Documentación Mineros de SONAMI.
- Sagredo, Rafael (2005). "Chile, país minero". In Lagos, Gustavo (ed.). Minería y desarrollo (in Spanish). Santiago, Chile: Ediciones Universidad Católica de Chile. pp. 271–294. ISBN 956-14-0844-9.
- Salazar, Gabriel; Pinto, Julio (2002). Historia contemporánea de Chile III. La economía: mercados empresarios y trabajadores. LOM Ediciones. ISBN 956-282-172-2.
- Sutulov, Alexander (1975). "Antecedentes históricos de la producción de cobre en Chile". In Sutulov, Alexander (ed.). El Cobre Chileno (in Spanish). Corporación Nacional del Cobre de Chile. pp. 1–62.
- Ulloa Urrutia, Alfie; Contreras Biekert, José Luis; Gana Aravena, Joaquín; Miranda Toledo, Rodrigo; Chauveau Gerber, Paul; Villalobos Valenzuela, Fernando; Farías Soto, Javiera (2017). Productividad en la Gran Minería del Cobre (in Spanish). Comisión Nacional de Productividad. ISBN 978-956-7725-08-3.
