= Caserones =

Copper mine in Chile

- Location within Atacama Region Location within Chile
- Location: Atacama Region, Chile; 28°10′8.56″S 69°32′1.06″W
- Products: Copper
- Production: 120,600 tons of copper fines 18,900 tons of copper cathodes 4,600 tons of molybdenum in concentrates
- Financial year: 2023
- Opened: 2014
- Company: SCM Minera Lumina Copper Chile: Lundin Mining (70%); JX Nippon Mining & Metals (30%)

Caserones is a low-grade copper and molybdenum mine in Tierra Amarilla in Atacama Region, Chile. The mine is operated by SCM Minera Lumina Copper Chile, a joint venture where Lundin Mining have 70% of the shares and JX Nippon Mining & Metals owns the remaining. The mine lies about 4,000 m a.s.l. in the Andes and just about six kilometers west of the Argentina–Chile border.

Construction of the mine started in 2010 and it began operations in 2014. Mining is expected to last until 2042 according to the mining plan. An environmental impact assessment to modify the previously approved mining project was submitted in 2020 and approved by authorities in July 2025. In January 2026 SCM Minera Lumina Copper submitted a plan to the Environmental Assessment Service to extend the mine lifetime to 2039.

Originally, JX Nippon Mining & Metals owned 51.5% of the mine and Mitsui Mining and Smelting owned 25.87% and Mitsui & Co. 22.63%. Later JX Nippon Mining & Metals acquired a 100% ownership of the mine before selling 51% of the shares to Lundin Mining in March 2023. The sale to Lundin Mining included an option for a further purchasing of 19% in the next five years, an option which Lundin Mining took in July 2024.

In February 2017 an agreement was signed for Caserones mine start export its products from Compañía Minera del Pacífico's Punta Totoralillo. Previously Caserones shipped its ores from Antofagasta 700 km to the north and Coquimbo 400 km to the south.

== See also ==
- Fundición Paipote, a nearby copper smelter
- Pirquinero, artisanal miners present in Tierra Amarilla and much of northern Chile
