= Punta Totoralillo =

Chilean port

- Interactive map of Punta Totoralillo
- Location in Chile

Location
- Country: Chile
- Coordinates: 26°51′15.99″S 70°48′56.37″W

Details
- Owned by: Compañía Minera del Pacífico
- Land area: 267.75 ha

Punta Totoralillo is a major industrial port for export of mining products in Chile's Atacama Region that serves multiple mines.

== History ==
=== Location and operations ===
The port lies 25 km north of the port city of Caldera and serves the iron mine of Cerro Negro Norte from which it receives iron ore concentrate from a 82 km long pipeline. Punta totoralillo also receives iron ore concentrate (>66% Fe) from Planta Magnetita through a 120 km-long buried pipeline. Planta Magnetita concentrates ore from the processing of the tailings of the copper mine of Candelaria and some of the iron ore of Los Colorados. In 2017 an agreement was signed for the copper mine of Caserones to start export its products from Punta Totoralillo.

=== Ownership and incidents ===
The port is owned by Compañía Minera del Pacífico. Its construction begun in 2006 and the first ores were shipped from it in 2008. In 2011 the port was approved by authorities to carry out modifications allowing it receive ore from third parties like Bellavista mine of Santa Fe Mining. The port was closed from December 2011 to April 2012 as result of an industrial fire.

=== Climate ===
Punta Totoralillo lies in an area of cold desert climate.
