= Copiapó =

- City and commune
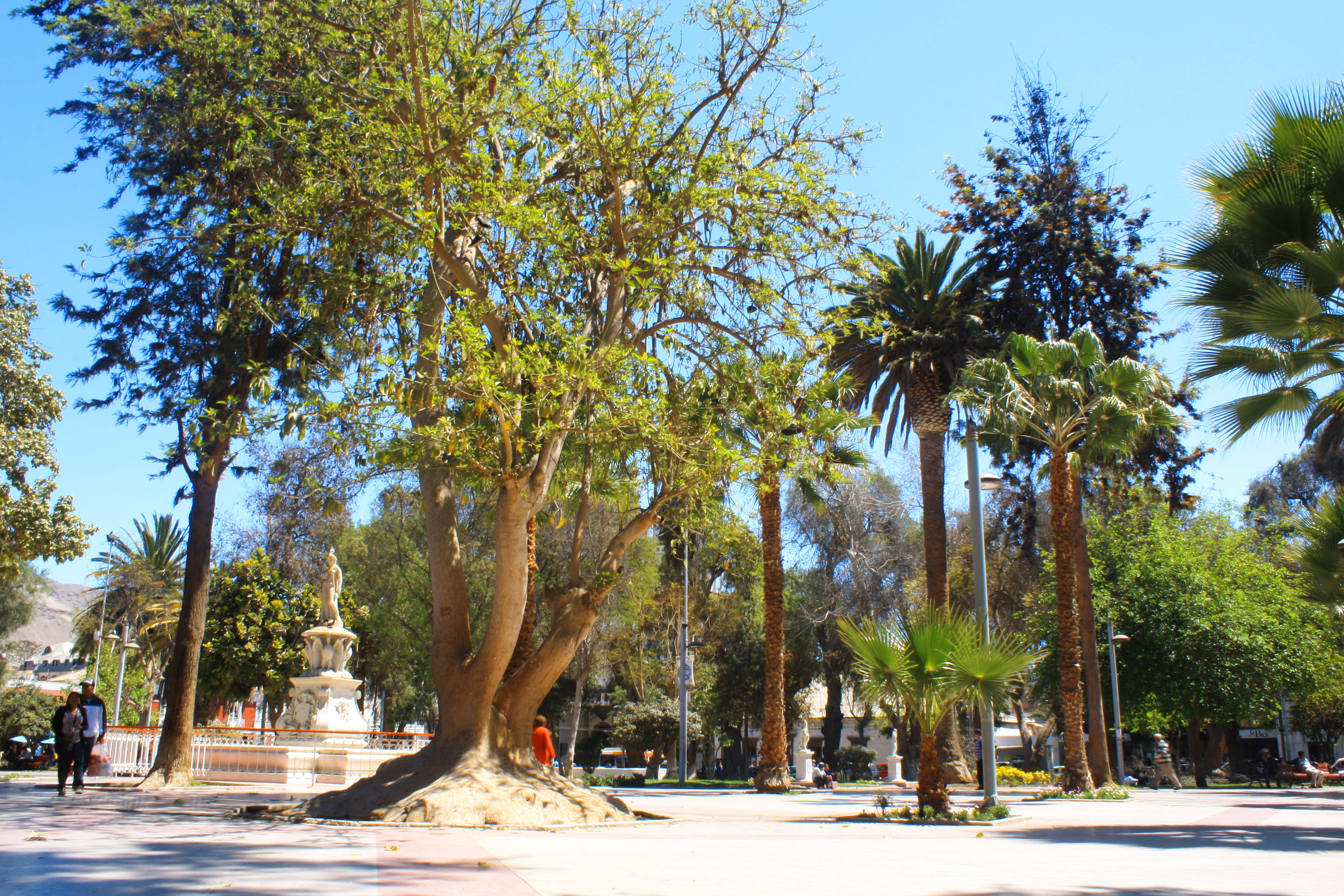
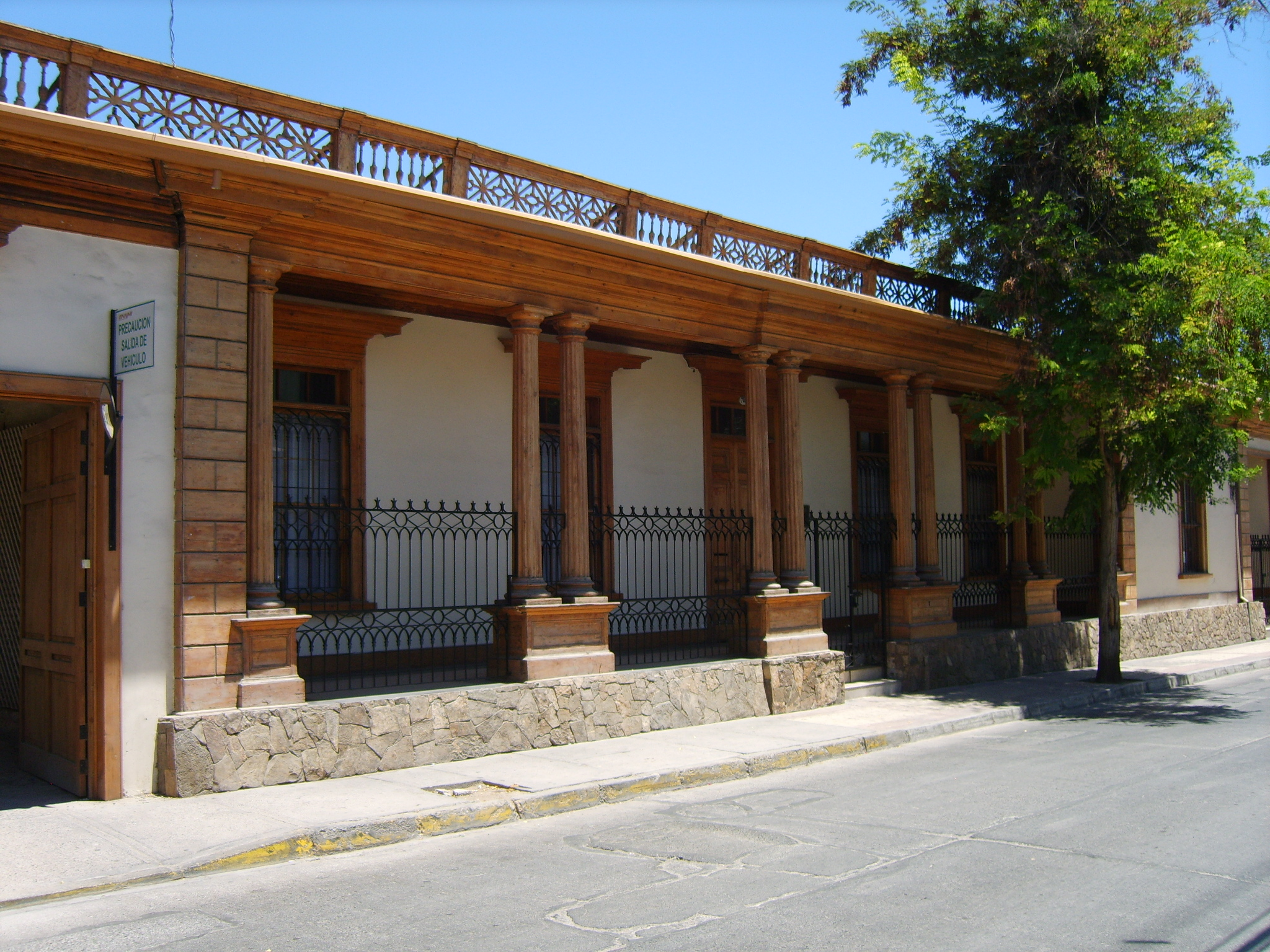
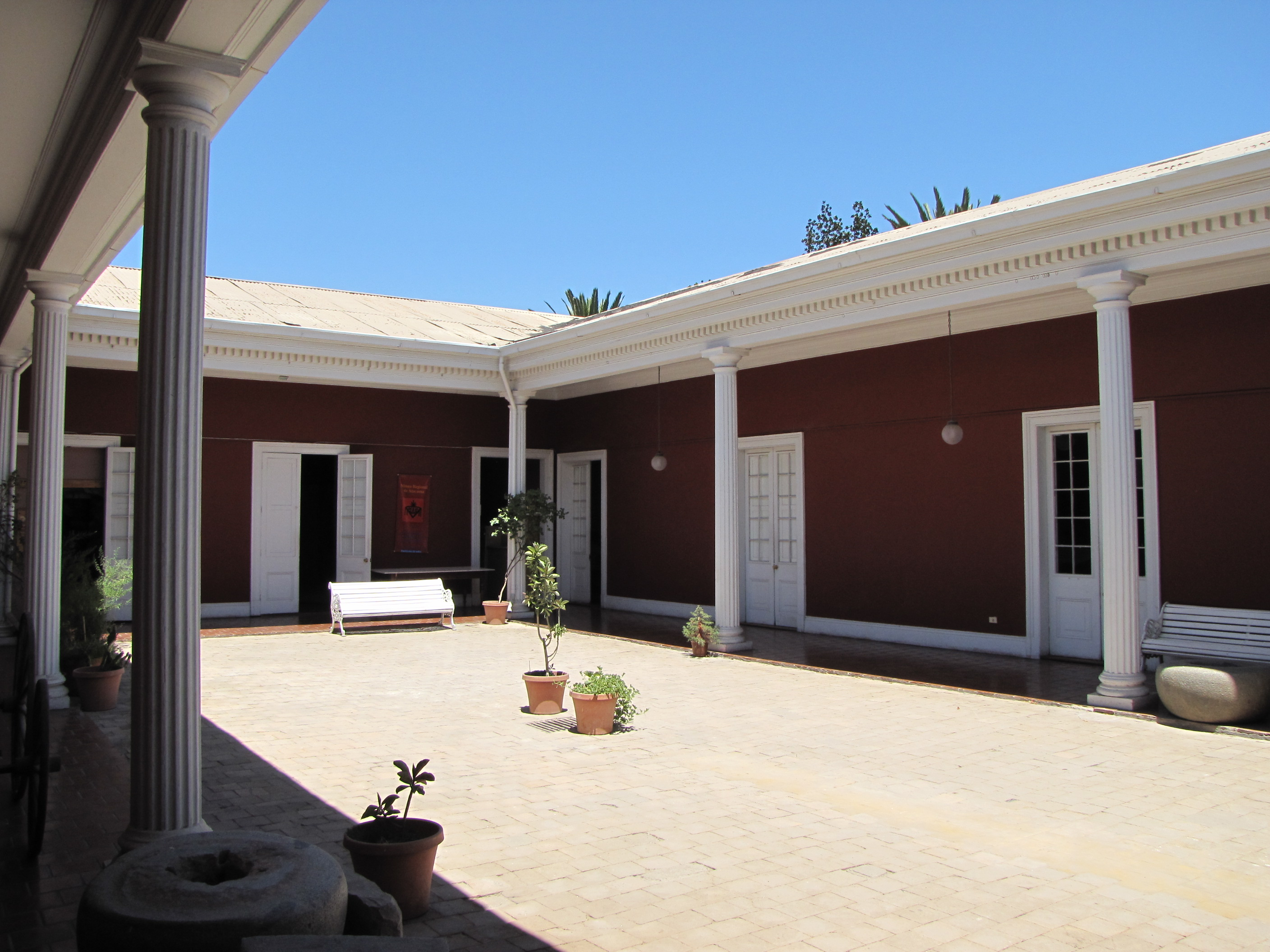
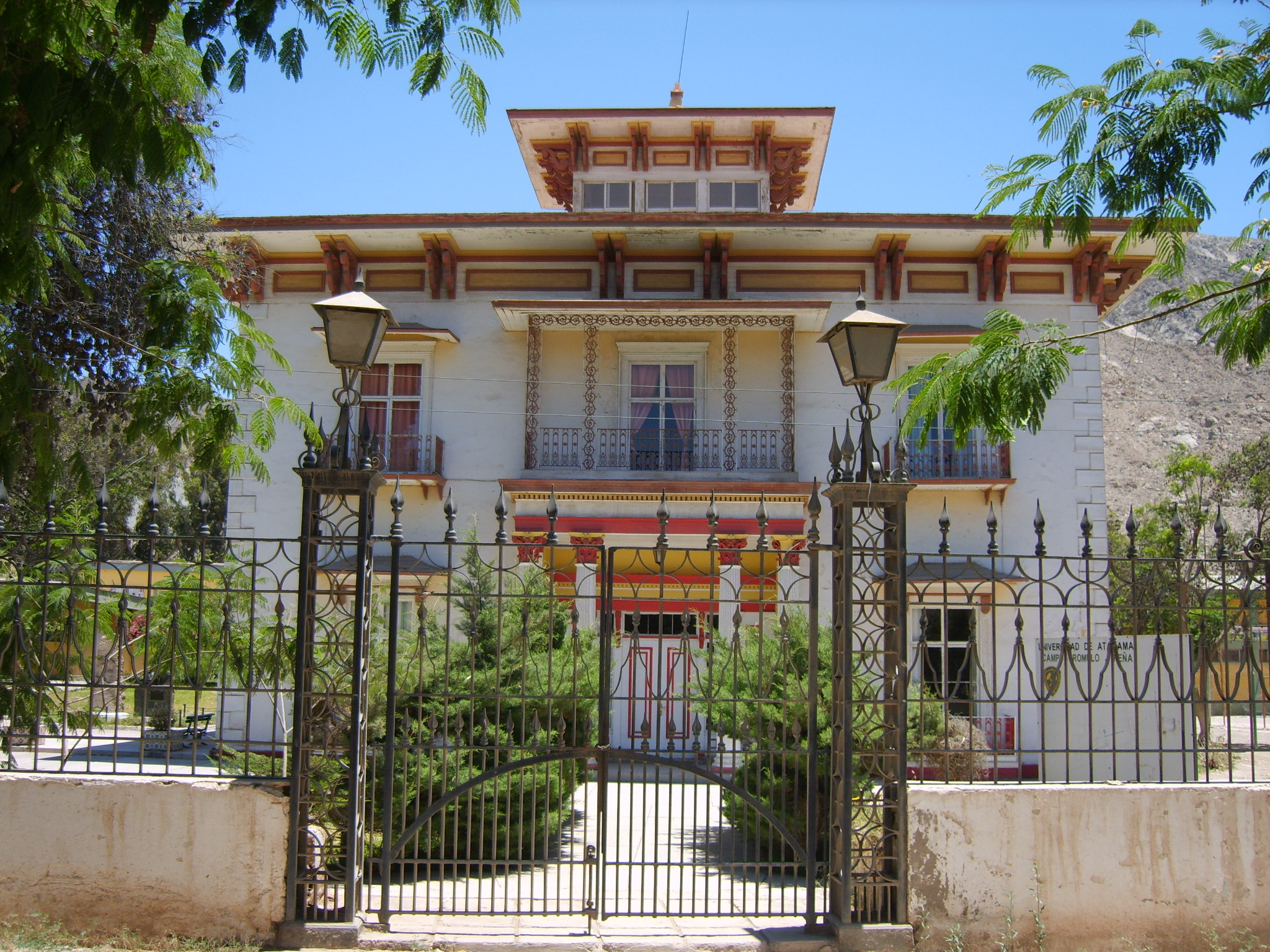
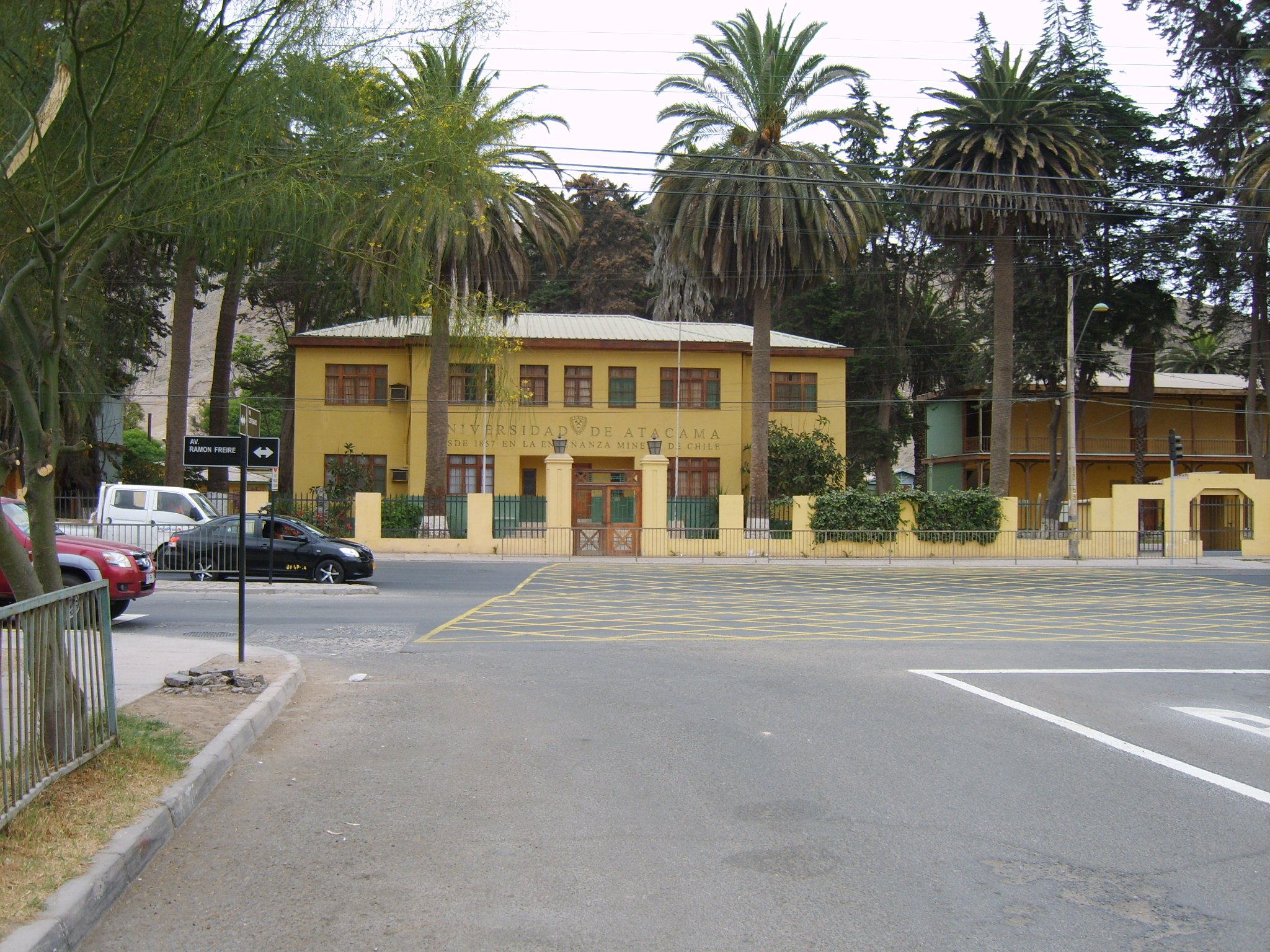
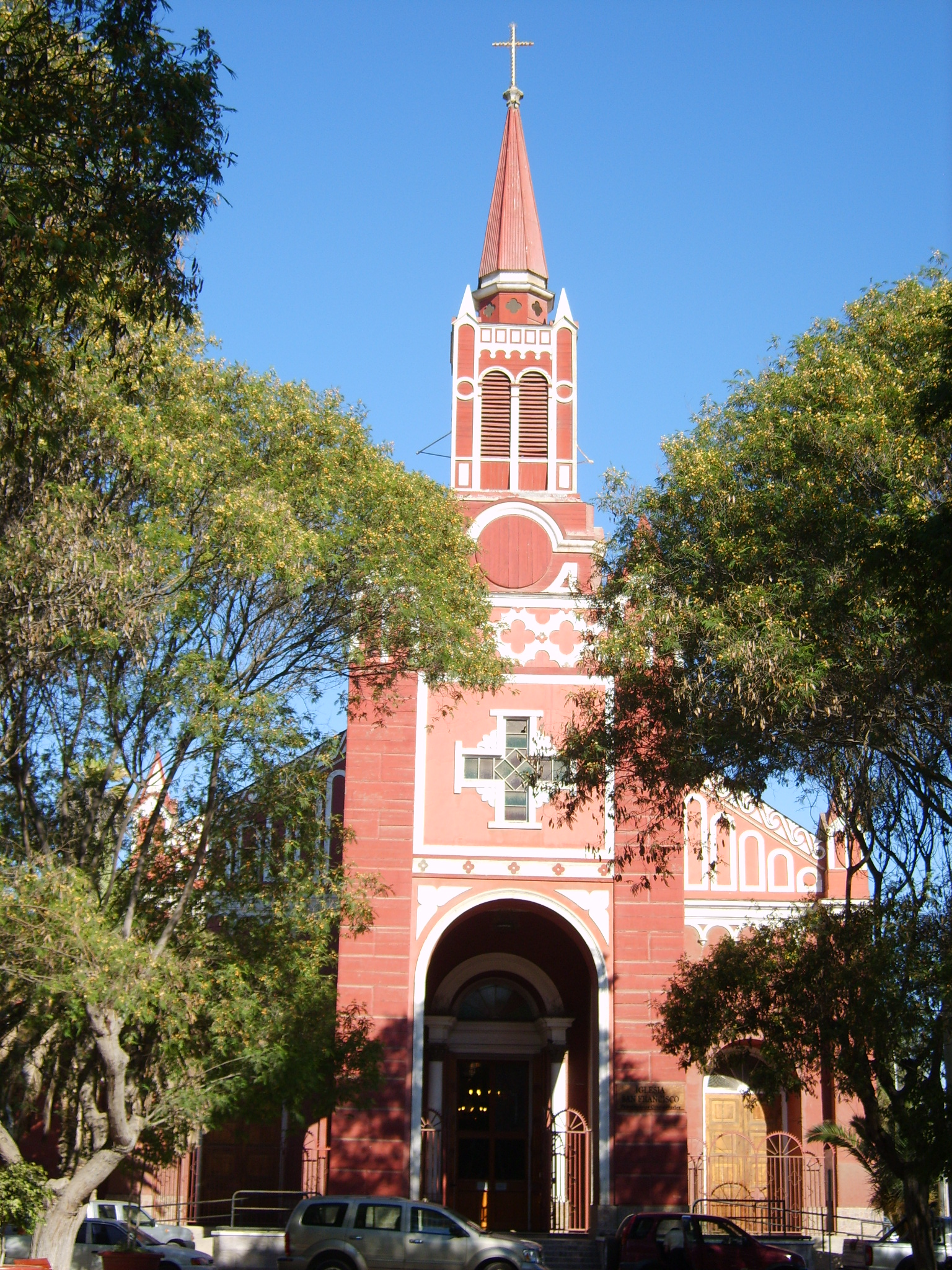
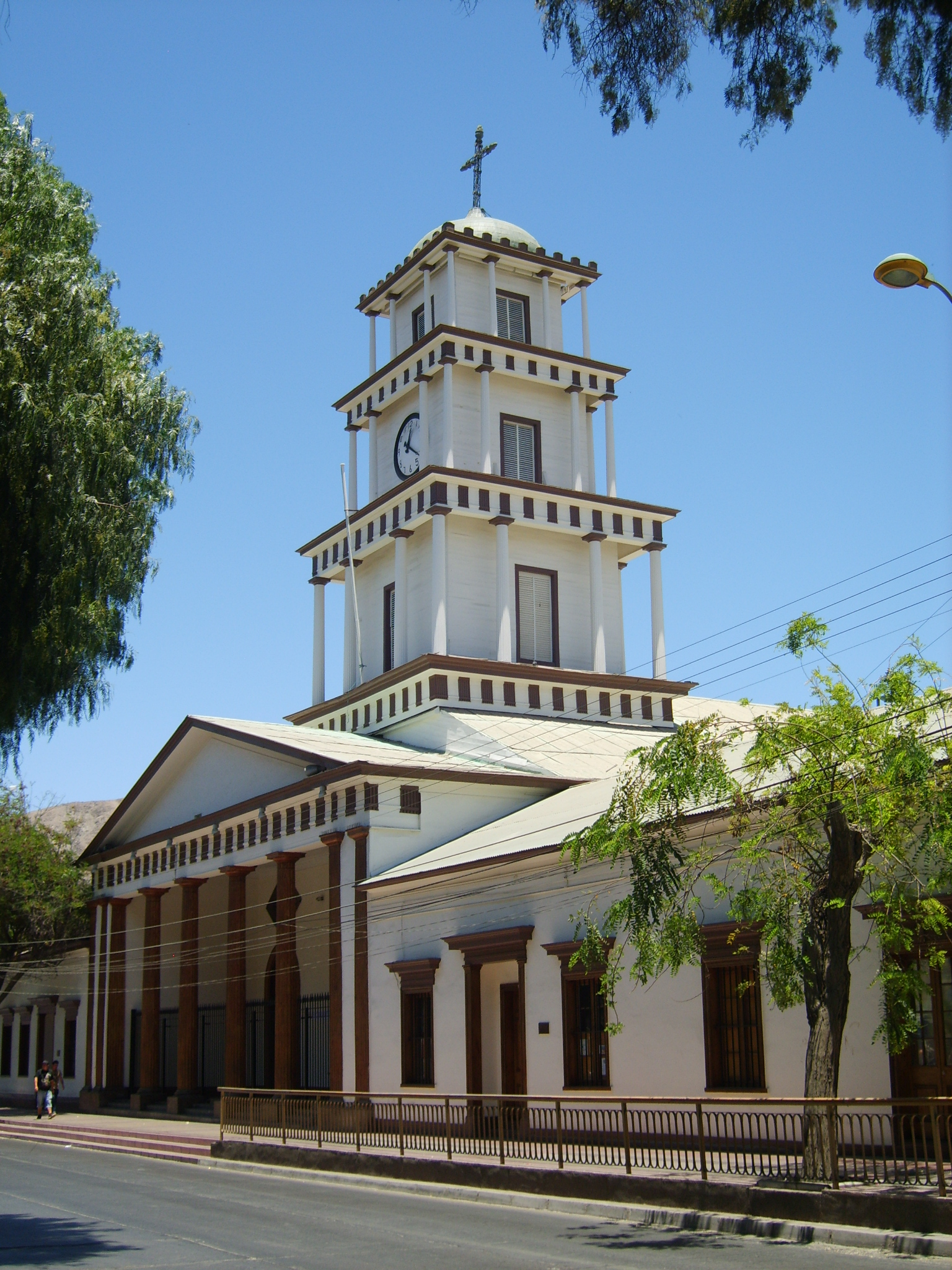
- Main Square, Toro Lorca Palace, Atacama Museum, Viña de Cristo Palace, Atacama University, San Francisco Church and Copiapó Cathedral

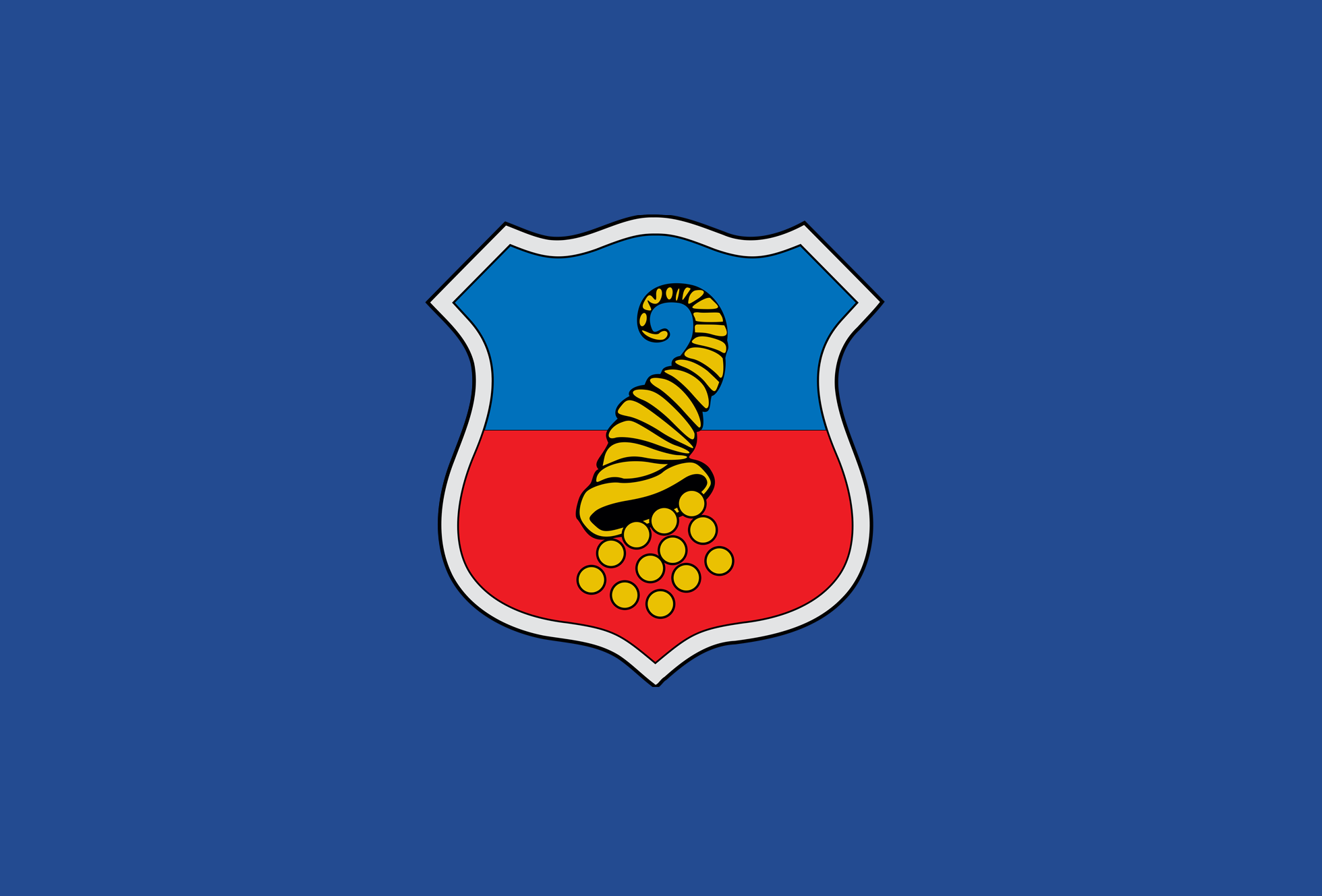
- Flag Coat of arms Location in Chile
- Anthem: Himno de Copiapó
- Coordinates: 27°21′59″S 70°19′59″W
- Country: Chile
- Region: Atacama
- Province: Copiapó
- Founded: December 8, 1744
- Founder: José Antonio Manso de Velasco

Government
  - Type: Municipality
  - Mayor: Maglio Cicardini (IND)

Area
  - City and commune: 16,681.3 km^{2} (6,440.7 sq mi)
- Elevation: 390 m (1,280 ft)

Population (2024)
  - City and commune: 168,831
  - Density: 10.1210/km^{2} (26.2132/sq mi)
  - Urban: 162,394
  - Rural: 6,437
- Demonym(s): copiapino, -a
- Time zone: UTC−4 (CLT)
  - Summer (DST): UTC−3 (CLST)
- Postal code: 1530000
- Area code: (+56) 52
- Climate: BWk
- Website: www.copiapo.cl (in Spanish)

Copiapó (Spanish pronunciation: [kopjaˈpo]) is a city and commune in northern Chile, located about 65 kilometers east of the coastal town of Caldera. Founded on 8 December 1744, it is the capital of Copiapó Province and Atacama Region.

Copiapó lies about 800 kilometres (500 mi) north of Santiago by the Copiapó River, in the valley of the same name. In the early 21st century, the river has dried up in response to climate change and more severe droughts. The town is surrounded by the Atacama Desert and receives 12 mm (½ in) of rain per year. It has 168,831 inhabitants.

Copiapó is in a rich silver and copper mining district, and while it attends large-scale mining operations further afar it is the central town of surrounding medium-scale mining mining district. A bronze statue commemorates Juan Godoy, discoverer of the Chañarcillo silver mines in the 19th century. The Copiapó-Caldera railway line, built in 1850, was the first one in South America. The first section between Caldera and Monte Amargo was inaugurated on 4 July 1850 in honor of the United States Independence Day, as American businessman William Wheelwright was responsible for the project. The original wooden railway station is now a National Monument.

== History ==
Spanish explorers founded the settlement in 1742 and named it San Francisco de la Selva de Copiapó or Saint Francis of the Jungle of Copiapó, due to its lush vegetation. Prior to Spanish occupation, the area was inhabited by the Diaguita people under the rule of the Inca Empire into the 16th century. Remains of Diaguita fortresses have been found in this area. The earliest archaeological remains of human activity in the Copiapó Valley are thought to be around 10,000 years old. The settlement developed around the remains of an Inca cemetery.

After the discovery of the rich silver deposits near Chañarcillo by Juan Godoy in 1832 it became an important mining centre, and until Chile annexed Antofagasta from Bolivia and Iquique and Arica from Peru following the War of the Pacific (1879–1883), Copiapó was the nation's northernmost city and main mining city.

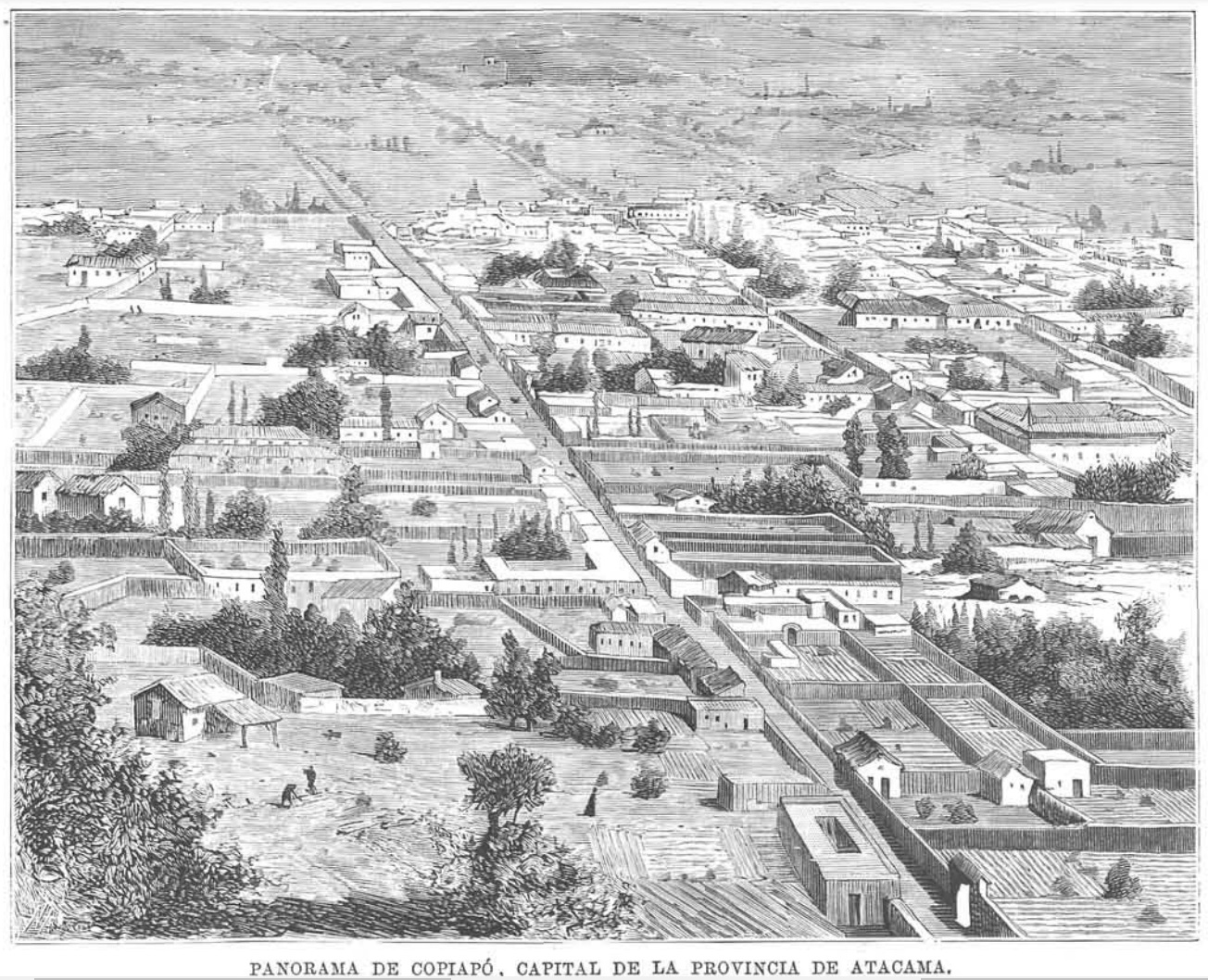
Panorama of Copiapó published in 1879 in La Ilustración Española y Americana

An earthquake on 4 December 1918 caused extensive damage throughout the city.

Through the 20th century, the city of Copiapó grew markedly, both from the mining industry and its role as capital of its department.

On 5 August 2010, the San José Copper Mine collapsed, trapping 33 miners underground. The mine was about 45 kilometers (28 mi) north of the city. The miners were 700 meters (2,300 ft) deep and 5 kilometers (3 mi) from the mine's entrance via spiraling underground ramps. Private, local, national and international resources cooperated in their rescue. The miners survived underground for 69 days until all were brought to the surface on 13 October 2010, a record period of time. This mine has been closed, but the industry of copper and gold mining is very important in the region.

== Climate ==
Copiapó has a desert climate (Köppen: BWh) with mild temperatures year round. Winters are mild with cool temperatures during the day, with a July maximum of 19.3 °C (66.7 °F) and cool to cold temperatures during the night, averaging 7 °C (44.6 °F). The cold Humboldt Current offshore leads to cool summer temperatures for being inland on its low latitude, and contributes to the very low annual rainfall. Temperatures rarely fall below freezing. Most of the precipitation falls during this time of the year with June and July being the wettest months. While winters are normally dry, precipitation is highly variable. This was the case when June 1998 recorded 68 millimetres (3 in) of precipitation but generally, in most years, precipitation is rare. Summers are warm with a January average of 22.2 °C (72.0 °F) and precipitation is virtually non-existent. Temperatures can occasionally exceed 30 °C (86.0 °F) any time of the year. The average annual precipitation is 18.8 millimetres (1 in), though this is highly variable, with some years recording no precipitation, as occurred in 1970, 1978, 1990, 1992–1993, and in 1998. There are 3.2 days with measurable precipitation. The record high was 34.0 °C (93.2 °F) in August 1972 and the record low was −2.0 °C (28.4 °F) in June 1975.

Climate data for Copiapó (291m)
Month	Jan	Feb	Mar	Apr	May	Jun	Jul	Aug	Sep	Oct	Nov	Dec	Year
Record high °C (°F)	33.8 (92.8)	31.6 (88.9)	32.4 (90.3)	31.8 (89.2)	31.4 (88.5)	33.4 (92.1)	32.8 (91.0)	34.0 (93.2)	32.7 (90.9)	32.4 (90.3)	32.2 (90.0)	31.4 (88.5)	34.0 (93.2)
Mean daily maximum °C (°F)	27.5 (81.5)	27.5 (81.5)	26.1 (79.0)	23.5 (74.3)	21.3 (70.3)	19.6 (67.3)	19.3 (66.7)	20.3 (68.5)	21.8 (71.2)	23.3 (73.9)	24.7 (76.5)	26.4 (79.5)	23.4 (74.1)
Daily mean °C (°F)	22.2 (72.0)	22.0 (71.6)	20.6 (69.1)	18.2 (64.8)	16.1 (61.0)	14.5 (58.1)	14.0 (57.2)	14.9 (58.8)	16.3 (61.3)	17.7 (63.9)	19.1 (66.4)	21.0 (69.8)	18.0 (64.4)
Mean daily minimum °C (°F)	15.5 (59.9)	14.9 (58.8)	14.0 (57.2)	11.9 (53.4)	9.6 (49.3)	7.8 (46.0)	7.3 (45.1)	8.2 (46.8)	9.5 (49.1)	10.8 (51.4)	12.5 (54.5)	14.3 (57.7)	11.3 (52.3)
Record low °C (°F)	7.0 (44.6)	2.5 (36.5)	1.4 (34.5)	3.4 (38.1)	0.4 (32.7)	−0.6 (30.9)	−2.0 (28.4)	−0.6 (30.9)	0.8 (33.4)	0.6 (33.1)	1.5 (34.7)	2.4 (36.3)	−2.0 (28.4)
Average precipitation mm (inches)	0.0 (0.0)	0.1 (0.00)	1.2 (0.05)	1.0 (0.04)	1.5 (0.06)	5.6 (0.22)	5.6 (0.22)	3.4 (0.13)	0.3 (0.01)	0.1 (0.00)	0.0 (0.0)	0.0 (0.0)	18.8 (0.74)
Average precipitation days	0.0	0.0	0.2	0.2	0.5	0.8	0.6	0.4	0.3	0.1	0.1	0.0	3.2
Average relative humidity (%)	60	61	63	66	67	66	65	65	63	61	60	59	63
Mean monthly sunshine hours	294.5	259.9	263.5	201.0	198.4	192.0	217.0	220.1	237.0	269.7	276.0	291.4	2,920.5
Mean daily sunshine hours	9.5	9.2	8.5	6.7	6.4	6.4	7.0	7.1	7.9	8.7	9.2	9.4	8.0
Source 1: Dirección Meteorológica de Chile
Source 2: Universidad de Chile (sunshine hours only)

== Demographics ==
Historical population
Year	Pop.	±% p.a.
1875	21,871	—
1885	15,428	−3.43%
1895	15,141	−0.19%
1907	17,025	+0.98%
1920	13,842	−1.58%
1930	14,962	+0.78%
1940	21,731	+3.80%
1952	26,138	+1.55%
1970	51,440	+3.83%
1982	71,612	+2.80%
1992	100,907	+3.49%
2002	129,091	+2.49%
2017	153,937	+1.18%
2024	168,831	+1.33%
Source: INE, Memoria Chilena

As of the 2024 census, the population is 168,831, of which 49.5% are males, and 50.5% are females. People aged under 15 years old make up 19.9% of the population, and people aged 65 years old and over make up 11.1%. 96.2% of the population is urban, and 3.8% is rural.

=== Ethnic minorities ===
As of the 2024 census, Indigenous peoples make up 23.7% of the population, and Afro-Chileans make up 1.1%.

=== Religion ===
As of the 2024 census, 73.6% of the population over 15 years old are Christians (59.0% Catholics, 11.5% Evangelicals or Protestants, and 3.2% other branches), 0.1% are Jews, 0.1% are Muslims, 0.1% are Buddhists, <0.1% are Hinduists, 0.4% are adrehents of other religions, and 25.7% are irreligious.

=== Immigration ===
As of the 2024 census, immigrants make up 11.4% of the population – 11.0% are from South America, 0.2% from North America, 0.1% from Europe, 0.1% from Asia, <0.1% from Africa, and 0% from Oceania.

== Administration ==
=== Municipal government ===
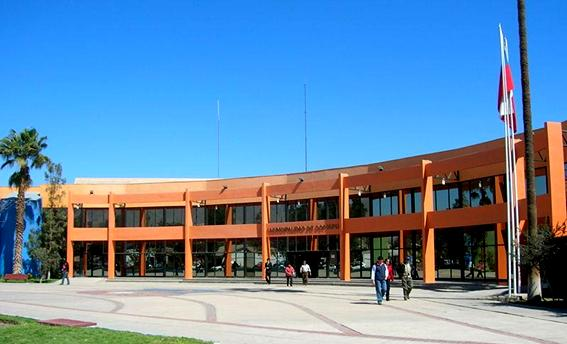
City Hall of Copiapó.

As a commune, Copiapó is a third-level administrative division of Chile administered by a municipal council, headed by an alcalde who is directly elected every four years. The 2012-2016 alcalde is Maglio Cicardini (Independent). The council has the following members:

- Magaly Milla Montaño (Independent)
- Luis Orrego Salinas (Independent)
- Rosa Ahumada Campusano (PC)
- José Bernardino Fernández Quevedo (PPD)
- Omar Luz Hidalgo (Independent)
- Anelice Véliz Kratzschmar (PS)
- Mario Enrique Bordoli Vergara (RN)
- Juan Carlos Mellibovsky Leiva (RN)

==== Recent municipal politics ====
Since the return to democracy in 1990, there have been six mayoral elections held in Copiapó.

In 1992, Mónica Calcutta (PPD) won the election against 24 candidates. Her term was characterized by public expenditures on green areas, parks, and street paving, and public infrastructure such as the new building of the City Hall (1994), the Estadio Techado (1996), and the Technological School (inaugurated in 1997). During her term, Calcutta encouraged people to participate. One of these activities was the "Train of History" carried out in 1994 (for the 250th anniversary of Copiapó) and 1995.

Despite all these expenditures, the City Hall ended up with no debt for 1996.

In 1996, Calcutta ran for the re-election, but was defeated by the socialist candidate Marcos López (city councilor 1992–1996) by a narrow margin of 146 votes. López's term differed substantially from Calcutta's; his first three years as mayor did not see any important public expenditures in visible things. They came out the year before the following election.

The 2000 election was a very confrontational one. López and Calcutta ran for election together with 10 other candidates. In spite of surveys that showed a virtual tie between them, López won the election with an overwhelming 50.07% of the votes to his rival's 31.52%.

López's second term in office was characterized by high public expenditures, part of it from the Central Government to improve Chilean infrastructure toward the bicentennial of Independence. These expenditures went towards redesigning the Central Square, Matta Avenue and the City Chamber.

In 2004, Marcos López was elected to another term, defeating the rightist candidate René Aedo (RN) with 50.01% to 40.82% of the votes.

In 2008, López ran for a fourth term, but was defeated by the independent candidate Maglio Cicardini Neyra, by a margin of less than 1% of the votes.

In 2012, López ran once again, but lost against Cicardini, who won the election with more than 50% of the votes.

In 2016, Cicardini lost against Marcos López.

=== Congressional representation ===
Within the electoral divisions of Chile, Copiapó is represented in the Chamber of Deputies by Lautaro Carmona (PC) and Daniella Cicardini Milla (Independent, backed up by the PS) as part of the 5th electoral district, (together with Chañaral and Diego de Almagro). The commune is represented in the Senate by Isabel Allende Bussi (PS) and Baldo Prokurica Prokurica (RN) as part of the 3rd senatorial constituency (Atacama Region).

== Attractions ==
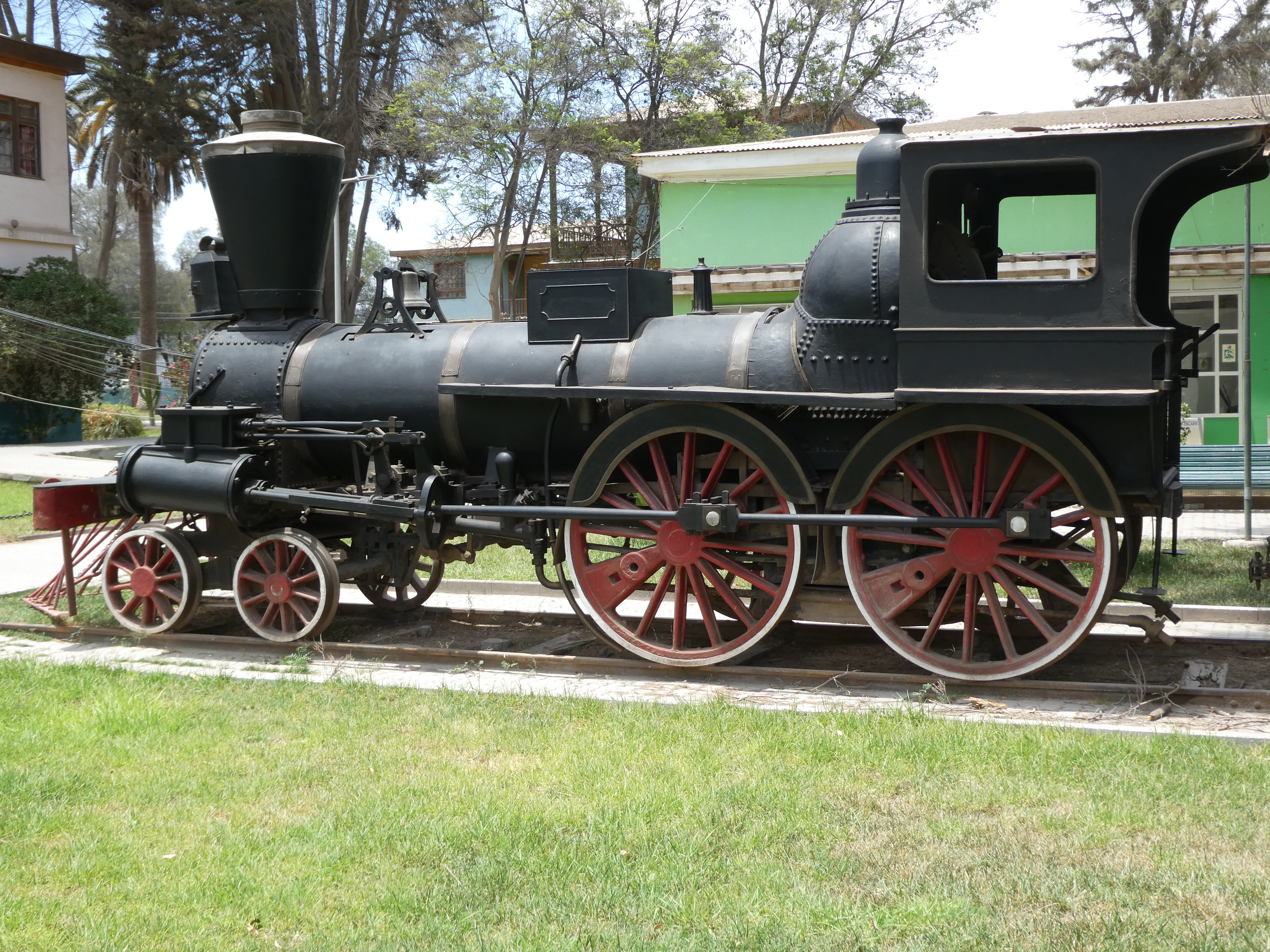
Copiapó steam locomotive, year 1850.

- Copiapó steam locomotive, year 1850. University of Atacama,
- Mineralogic Museum,
- Plaza de Armas,
- Regional Museum of the Matta Family,
- Wooden Railway Station,
- the San José Copper Mine (closed in 2010);
- Totoralillo, Totoral and the zone of "Travesía" on the coast, wherein after rain, the "Desierto Florido" appears;
- In the Andes, the Ojos del Salado volcano, and the lakes Green and Negro Francisco,
- Tres Cruces National Park in the Andes.

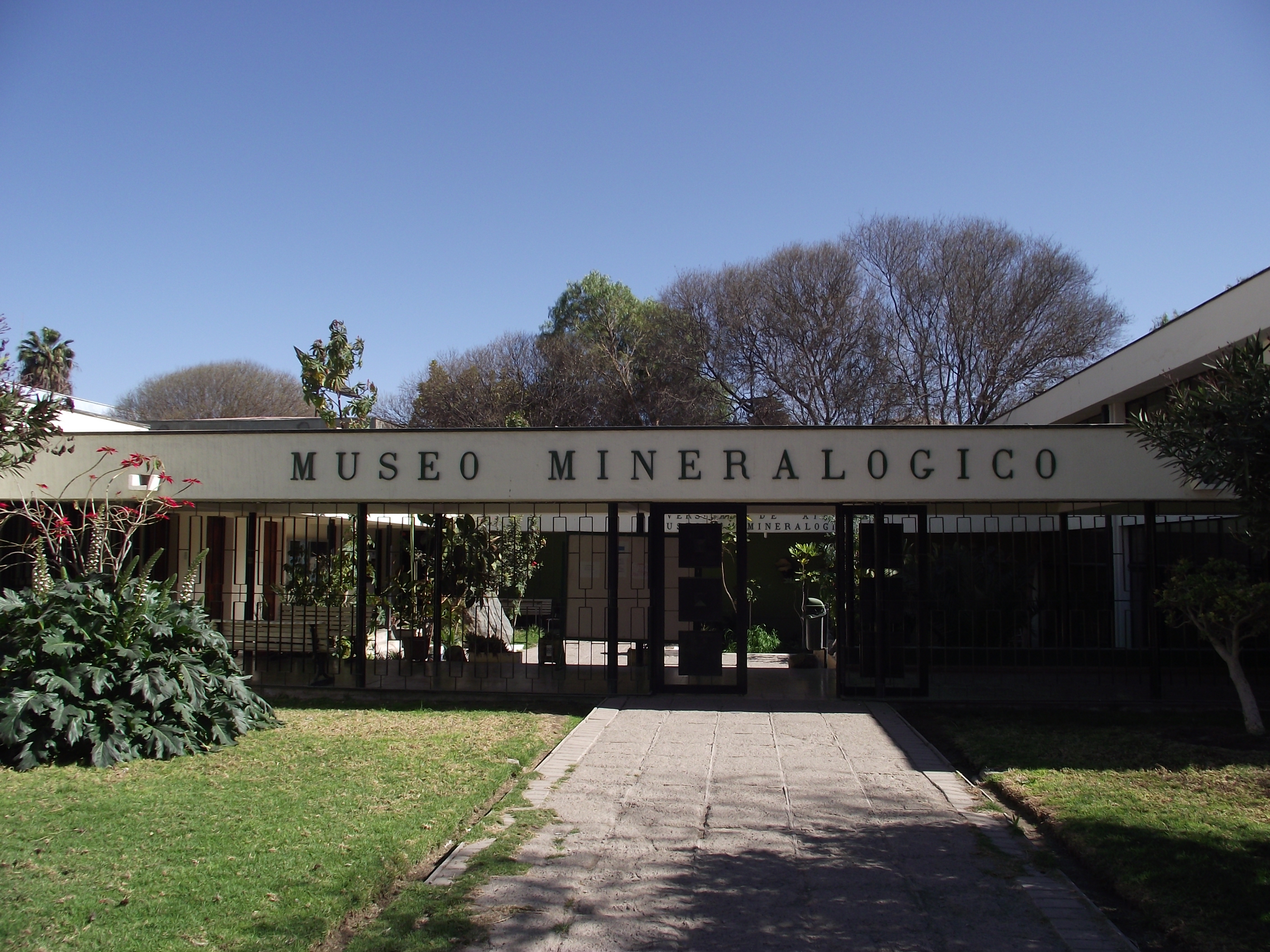
Copiapó Mineralogic Museum

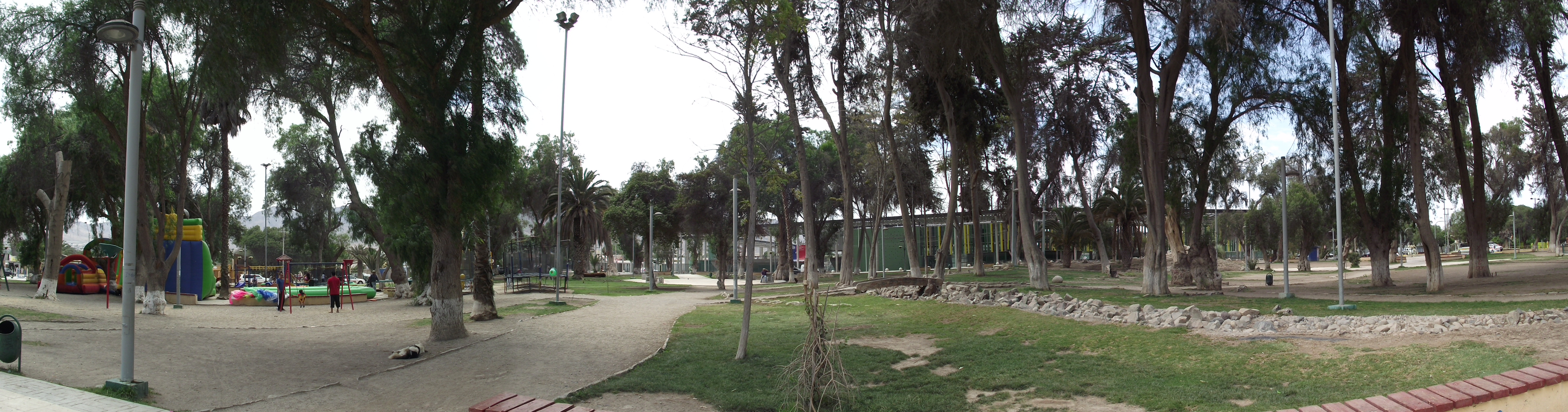
Schneider Park (Parque Schneider)

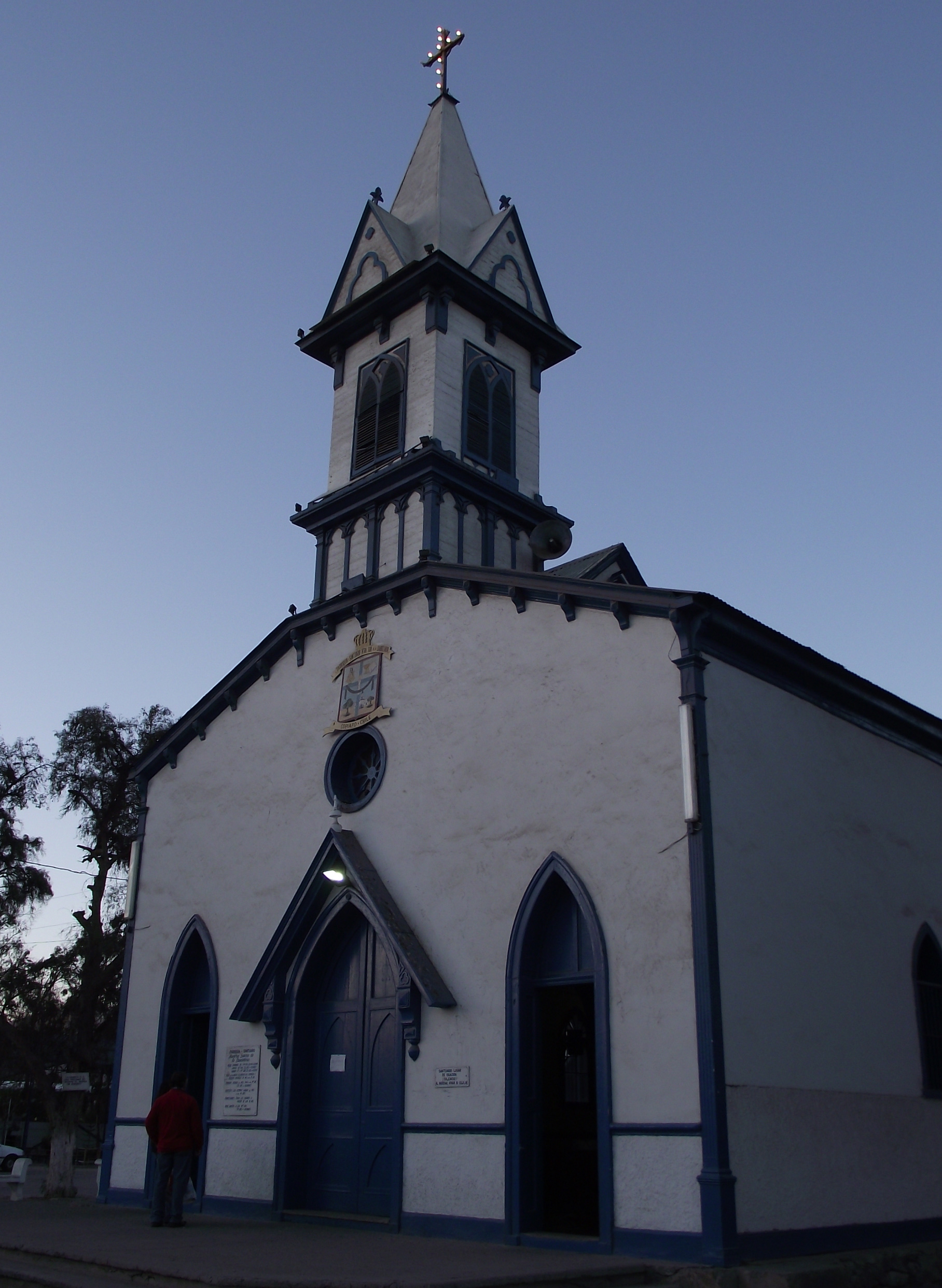
Santuario Candelaria Church

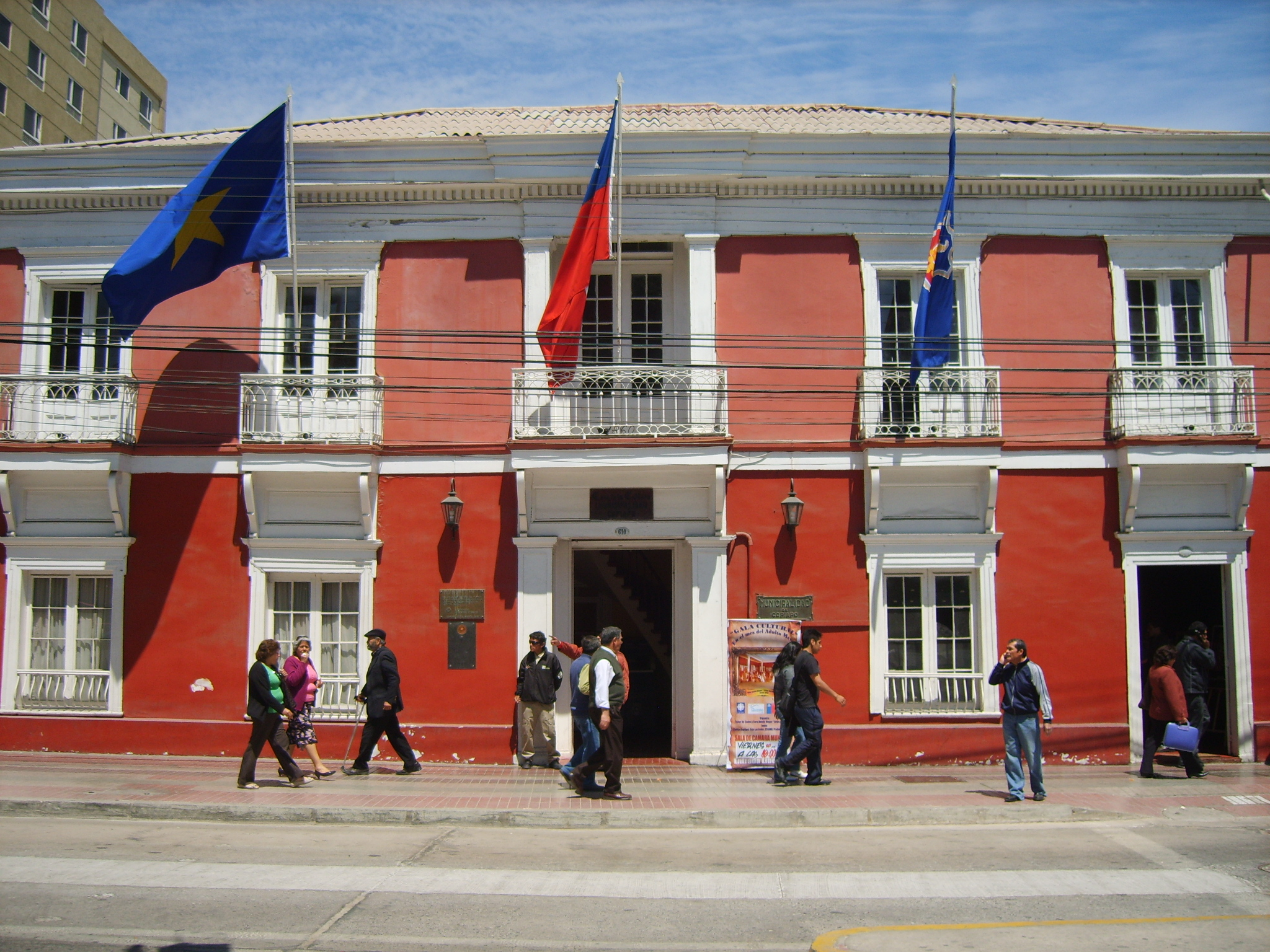
Copiapo Culture House (Casa de la Cultura de Copiapo)

== Economy ==
Copiapó has a diversified and potential economy, but mining is the largest economic activity. The Copiapó Basin has a great deal of copper ore, mined by companies such as Minera Candelaria, which extracts copper near Tierra Amarilla, a neighboring commune. This generates a need for transportation, light industry, and services. "Small mining" represents over 30% of the production. The copper obtained by pirquineros (miners) goes to the copper smelter at Paipote.

Agriculture is the second-largest source of income in this area. It consists largely of grape production, with olives, tomatoes, avocados and some citrus fruits also produced as commodity crops.

Industry: Copiapó has mainly light industry, and some medium industry such as the INACESA plant and Paipote copper refinery.

Energy: Many important solar plants were built in the Atacama Region, benefiting from the high amount of and constant solar radiation during the year. Solar photovoltaic energy production in 2016 reached more than 400 MW connected to the Central-North grid.

Commerce is growing in Copiapó, largely old and new, small and medium enterprises. Downtown Copiapó activity reflects the growth of the city. Some local enterprises have grown rapidly in the last decade, such as the Albasini and Don Álvaro chain-stores. The national government's free-market policies, along with a higher demand and better economic expectations, have encouraged the establishment here of such national businesses as the supermarkets Deca (1999), Jumbo (2005), and Lider (2006).

Tourism in Copiapó has been developing since the early 21st century. Some come to see the desert and indigenous monuments, such as the Inca cemetery in the city, which was investigated in the 1930s. In addition, a new casino has attracted both domestic and foreign tourists, and hotels have invested in new amenities and structures to satisfy demand.

== Transport ==
Copiapo is served by Desierto de Atacama Airport, with commercial passenger airline service on three of Chile's major airlines.

== Education ==
Copiapó provides public and private education, from kindergarten to high school, and also technical and bachelor's degrees.

=== Schools ===
According to the Department of Education of Chile, Copiapó had (2007) an enrollment of more than 35,000 students, divided in the following programs: Kindergarten, 3,780 students; Differencial Education, 1,009 students; Elementary and Middle School, 20,794 students; High School, 10,291 students (5,185 in Scientific-Humanist programs and 5,106 in Technical-Professional programs).

La commune of Copiapó offers public and private education held by 64 schools, divided in: 61 urbans and 3 rurals; 32 public, 23 State-subsidized private schools and 9 private schools.

=== Universities ===
- Universidad de Atacama was founded in 1857, and is the only public university in the Third Region.
- Universidad Santo Tomás (Copiapó)
- Universidad Tecnológica de Chile, INACAP (Copiapó)

=== Professional institutes ===
- Instituto Tecnológico UDA (public)
- Santo Tomás (private)
- Inacap (private)
- Iplacex (private)

=== Technical centers of study ===
- CFT Benjamín Teplizky (private)
- CFT Santo Tomás (private)
- CFT Inacap (private)
- CFT Cepa (private)

== Sports and recreation ==
=== Football ===
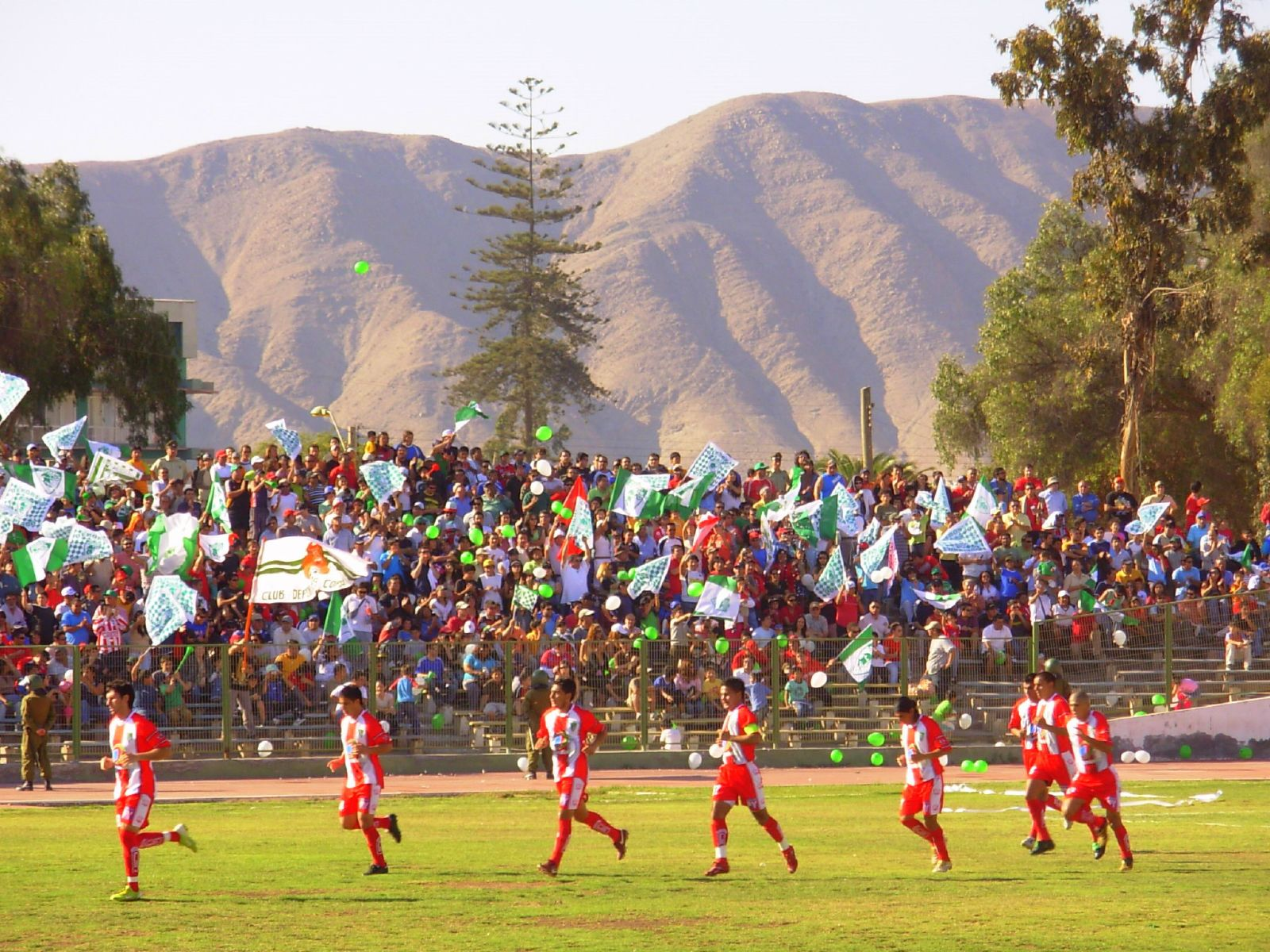
Deportes Copiapó and its fans in the local stadium.

This city has a football team called Club de Deportes Copiapó, which was born after the dissolution of Regional Atacama, in 1999. It plays in the Primera A League of football of Chile, and plays as local in the Luis Valenzuela Hermosilla Stadium and in the Municipal Stadium of Tierra Amarilla.

=== Raid Atacama ===
This event began in 1992.

For its efforts, Raid Atacama received the National Award for Tourism. In the last seven years, the enrollment has kept steady on an average of about 500 vehicles per event, and more than 1,800 participants from all regions of the country and abroad.

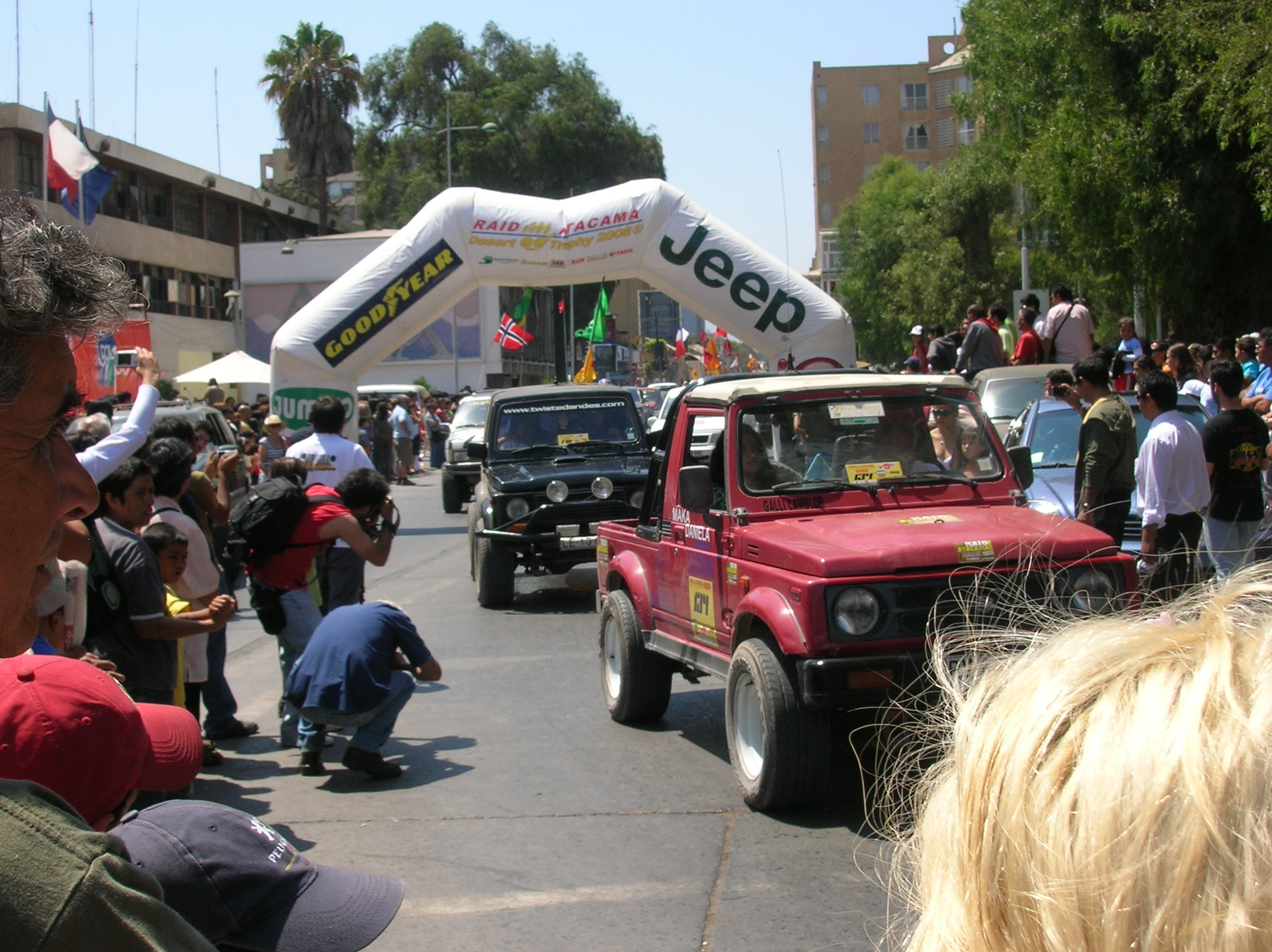
Raid Atacama at its start line in Copiapó.

In 1997, it reached the largest number of participants to date, bringing together 613 4x4 participating vehicles.

=== Rally Dakar ===
Since 2009, Copiapó is one of the Chilean communes the Rally Dakar Chile-Argentina has passed through.

== International relations ==
The city of Copiapó is home to a number of international relations institutions, such as the Regional Unit for International Affairs (URAI) of the Regional Government of Atacama, responsible for analyzing and managing the region's bilateral and multilateral relations with Latin America and the rest of the world; the regional office of the National Migration Service; the regional office of the General Directorate for Export Promotion (ProChile); the Department of Migration and International Police of the Investigations Police of Chile; and the Migrant Office of the Municipality of Copiapó.

In the field of higher education internationalization, the main actor in Copiapó is the Internationalization Unit of the University of Atacama.

=== Consulates ===
- Italy (Honorary Vice-Consulate)
- Lebanon (Honorary Consulate)
- Romania (Honorary Consulate)

=== Twin towns – sister cities ===
- Catamarca, Argentina
- Córdoba, Argentina
- Felipe Varela, Argentina
- La Rioja, Argentina
- Santiago del Estero, Argentina
- Jiujiang, China
- Nanchang, China
- Panyu, China
- Pingxiang, China
- Ruichang, China
- Castellón de la Plana, Spain
