= André Sougarret =

Chilean engineer and mining executive

André Sougarret is a Chilean mining engineer who since May 2025 is the board president of the iron mining company Compañía Minera del Pacífico. Sougarret was previously the CEO of state-owned copper mining company Codelco in 2022–2023. He led the rescue efforts of the 2010 Copiapó mining accident, and has been director of El Teniente mine, and executive vice-president of Empresa Nacional de Minería. Following his leadership in the rescue of the 2010 Copiapó mining accident's 33 miners he was named "engineer of the year" and "mining engineer of the year" by the Chilean engineers' association. In the movie The 33 Sougarret was portrayed by Gabriel Byrne. The film incorrectly portrays Sougarett halting the rescue operation due to safety concerns, a decision he did not make in the real rescue effort.
