= Fundición Paipote =

Copper smelting plant in Atacama, Chile

Coordinates: 27.4212°S 70.2589°W

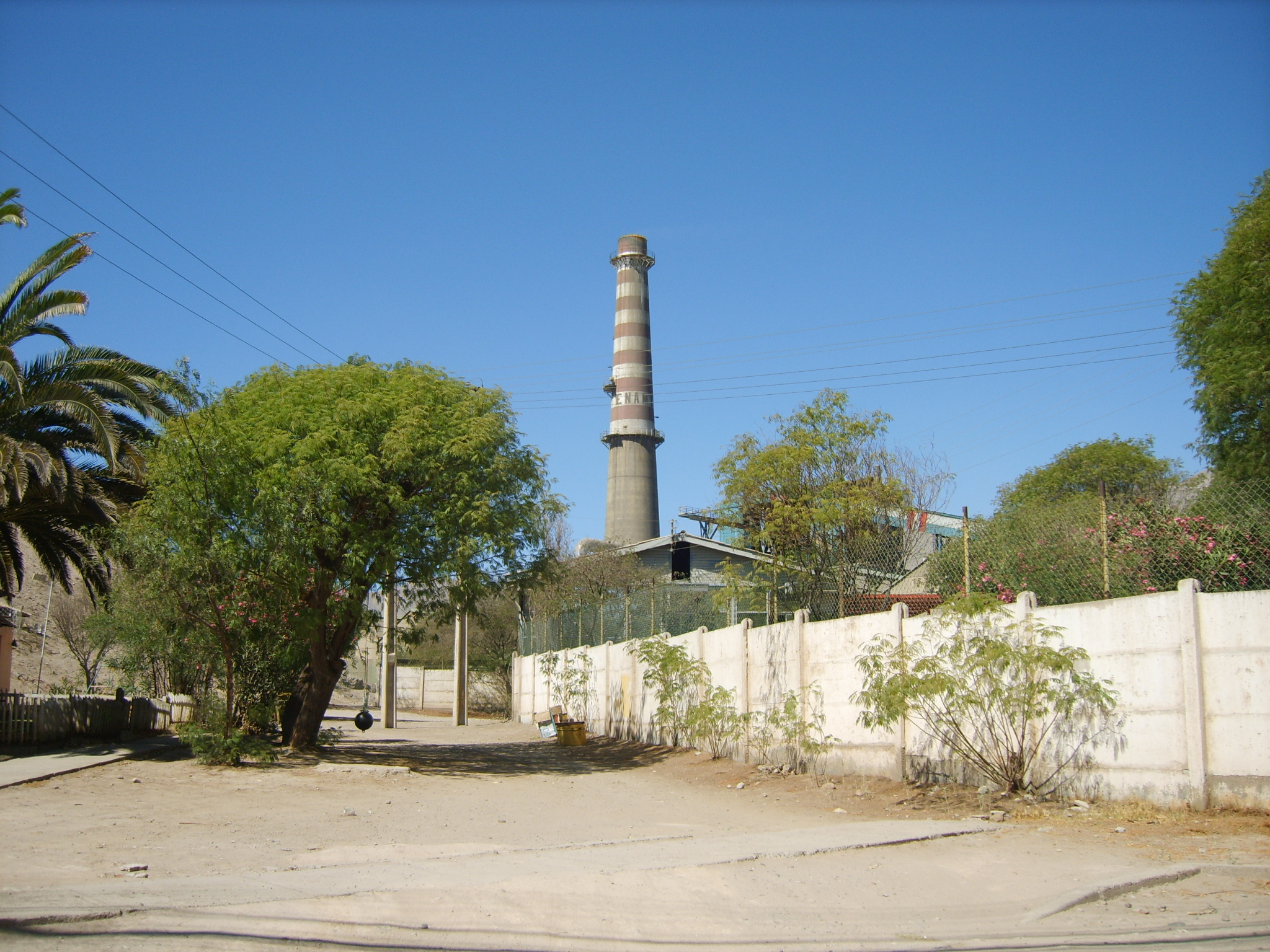
Chimney of Fundición Paipote.

Fundición Hernán Videla Lira, better known as Fundicón Paipote, and formerly known as Fundición Nacional Paipote, is a copper smelter plant 8 km southeast of Copiapó in Chile's Atacama Region. It operates with a Teniente Converter smelting technology and produces copper anodes made of 99.6% of copper. The smelter is owned by ENAMI and has been paralyzed since February 2024 for a major overhaul costing a total of 1,700 million USD. At the time of paralyzation the smelter generated economic losses for ENAMI. ENAMI has reached out for investors to finance the overhaul offering offsets paid as cathode copper.

It is classified as a "custom smelter" as it does not depend on ore concentrate from a particular mine nor does it lie next to one. It was established in 1952 with the stated aim of smelting ores of small and medium-scale mining in the Atacama Region. Besides copper it also processes ore concentrates of silver and gold.

In 2015 it had a capacity to produce 84,000 t (93,000 short tons) of copper yearly making it the smallest of Chile's seven active copper smelters at the time. As of 2025, the overhaul plan consider the smelter to reach a cathode production capacity of 240,000 tons Cu per year.

The smelter has been criticized for exceeding on certain occasions by far (almost 500%) the sulfur dioxide emission cap set by environmental regulations in 2019 which is 350 μg/m^{3} SO_{2} per hour. In addition there were accusations in 2021 of doctoring of smelting process data.

It is named after Hernán Videla Lira (1903–1982), a mining businessman and politician .

== See also ==
- Alexander Sutulov – Chilean-Russian extractive metallurgist
- Gold mining in Chile
- Pirquinero
- Planta de Pellets – iron ore pellet plant in Atacama Region
- Planta Magnetita – iron ore processing plant in Atacama Region
