= Planta Magnetita =

Mineral processing plant in Tierra Amarilla, Chile

Coordinates: 27°31′15.74″S 70°19′7.85″W

Planta Magnetita is a mineral processing plant owned by Compañía Minera del Pacífico (CMP) in Tierra Amarilla, Atacama Region, Chile. The plant processes tailings from Candelaria copper mine and some ore of Los Colorados iron mine. It is the largest plant that extracts ore from tailings in Chile.

From Planta Magnetita ore concentrate of pellet feed grade (>66% Fe) is transported in a 120km-long buried pipeline to the port of Punta Totoralillo for export to Asia. The processing plant began operations in 2008 and uses only desalinated sea water for its processes.

The plant has been called the "largest circular economy project in mining in Chile" by Revista Minera Crisol and El Desconcierto, and in 2022 Planta Magnetita was awarded the San Lorenzo Prize by Sociedad Nacional de Minería and Asociación de Pirquineros de Tierra Amarilla for its contributions to sustainable development. In 2023 CMP was sanctioned for irregularities in the position of one of its overhead power lines running through a protected area of desert bloom.

== See also ==
- Planta de Pellets
