= Planta de Pellets =

Mineral processing plant in Huasco, Chile

Coordinates: 28°28′50.18″S 71°14′47.69″W

Planta de Pellets is a mineral processing and pellet-producing plant owned by Compañía Minera del Pacífico (CMP) in Huasco, Atacama Region, Chile. The plant processes iron ore from the mine of Los Colorados in the Chilean Iron Belt. It produces annually 4.5 million metric tons of pellets. The magnetite ore arrives to the plant by train and the leaves it by sea through the adjoining port of Puerto Guacolda II.

The origins of the plant lies in the iron mine of El Algarrobo whose high profitability up to 1966 contributed to the creation of the ambitious "Plan de Desarrollo para el Valle del Huasco" by Compañía de Acero del Pacífico in 1970. This was later however scaled-down but retained the establishment of a pellet factory. The plant was launched on May 15, 1978, and had then a maximum capacity to produce 3.5 million tons of pellets. (Note: Dictator Augusto Pinochet attended the inauguration of the plant.) For a while it ranked as the second largest pellet plant of its type in the world. In its early years it had over 3000 employees and a substantial part of its workers and engineers were either Japanese from Kobe Steel or American from McKee Worldwide. Its establishment allowed for the mine of El Algarrobo to remain operational until 1998.

From its opening in 1978 to 2010 Planta de Pellets legally disposed its tailings in the sea, being the only such disposal in Chile. In 2017 the conservation organization Oceana denounced on environmental grounds the irregular diposal of tailings from Planta de Pellets to the sea. This resulted in the Planta de Pellets committing in 2019 to cease using this disposal method by late 2023.

== See also ==
- Fundición Paipote
- Planta Magnetita
