= El Algarrobo =

Iron mine in Chile

- Location within Atacama Region Location within Chile
- Location: Atacama Region, Chile; 28°48′30.7″S 70°59′6″W
- Products: Iron
- Opened: 1959
- Closed: 1998
- Company: Compañía Minera del Pacífico
- Acquired: 1959

El Algarrobo is a closed iron mine in north-central Chile. Desigs to open a mine in El Algarrobo date to the early 20th century when there was a drive to establish a steel industry in Chile. The mine was however established in 1959 and mined by Compañía de Acero del Pacífico with a rairoad established by the mid-1960s that connected it to the port of Huasco. In 1978 El Algarrobo begun to feed ore to the Planta de Pellets in Huasco. In 1982 Compañía de Acero del Pacífico transformed into a holding and the subsidiary Compañía Minera del Pacífico operated the mine until its closure in 1998. Durings its operative life the mine was an important pillar in the economy of the nearby city of Vallenar.

Geologically El Algarrobo is an iron oxide-apatite (IOA) type of deposit. El Algarrobo is part of a wider province of iron ores known as the Chilean Iron Belt.

== History ==
Indigenous peoples probably knew of the site of El Algarrobo since earlier, but first written record of it is from 1895. The ore deposit El Algarrobo attracted some attention in the early 20th century as a possible supply for the planned steel mills of Corral in southern Chile. In 1913, the property of El Algarrobo along with other deposits was sold in Paris to Dutch and German firms. The terms of the sale begun a legal dispute about the ownership of the mine that ended in 1926 with the Supreme Court of Chile confirming the sale. The European owners did never mine El Algarrobo but they carried out explorations in it in the 1945–1952 period. Compañía de Acero del Pacífico acquired the deposit in 1959 and begun mining it giving birth to the modern mine. The activity of El Algarrobo caused by 1960 a population boom in the nearby city of Vallenar. By 1965 the mine was connected by railroad to the port of Huasco.

Until 1966 it was a highly profitable mine but from the 1970s onward El Romeral came to overshadow El Algarrobo in terms of production. The high profitability of the mine during most of 1960s contributed to the creation of the ambitious "Plan de Desarrollo para el Valle del Huasco" by Compañía de Acero del Pacífico in 1970, which was however scaled-down but retained the establishment of a pellets factory. The inauguration of the Planta de Pellets in Huasco in 1978 which needed a feed of iron ore allowed to extend the operational life of El Algarrobo until 1998.

== Bibliography ==
- Millán, Augusto (1999). Historia de la minería del hierro en Chile [History of iron mining in Chile] (in Spanish). Santiago de Chile: Editorial Universitaria. ISBN 956-11-1499-2.
- Zambra, Jorge Eduardo (2018). Huasco Esencial [Essential Huasco] (in Spanish). Ediciones Mediodía en Punto. ISBN 978-956-9170-35-5.
