= Candelaria mine =

Copper deposit in Atacama Region, Chile

- Location within Atacama Region Location within Chile
- Location: Tierra Amarilla, Atacama Region, Chile; 27.4646°S 70.2752°W
- Products: Copper, gold, silver (as concentrate); Magnetite iron ore (from tailings)
- Production: 151,719 tonnes copper 91,000 ounces gold
- Financial year: 2021
- Discovered: 1987 (Phelps Dodge)
- Opened: 1995
- Company: Lundin Mining (80%); Sumitomo Group (20%)

The Candelaria mine is a large open pit and underground copper-gold mine located in northern Chile in the Atacama Region. Candelaria has Proven and Probable Reserves of 676 million tonnes of ore grading 0.53% copper, 0.13 g/t gold, and 1.79 g/t silver; containing 3.58 million tonnes of copper, 3.0 million oz of gold and 39 million oz of silver. The mine project incorporates a reverse osmosis plant at the port of Caldera, commissioned in 2013, with a capacity to produce 500 litres per second of desalinated industrial water, piping it 115 km from the Pacific Ocean to the minesite.

The project was operated since discovery in 1987 by Phelps Dodge Corporation, which was taken over by Freeport-McMoRan in 2007. Lundin Mining bought out Freeport's 80% stake in 2014. The mine uses the mechanized port of Punta Padrones in Caldera for its mineral export. The port was established in 1995.

Its tailings are processed in Planta Magnetita, located immediately west of the mine pit, for the recovery of iron. From Planta Magnetita iron ore concentrate (>66% Fe) pumped through a 120 km-long buried pipeline to the port of Punta Totoralillo for export.

== Geology ==
The mine lies a north-south area of deformed Mesozoic sedimentary rocks known as Paipote Fold and Thruist Belt. It lies along a fault that is roughly coeval with the intrusion of magma in the Cretaceous Period which caused the mineralization of the ore deposit in the Punta del Cobre Formation.

== Environmental issues ==
On June 12 2019, people in Villa Estadio, a nearby community, raised safety concerns, especially for children and older adults. According to OECD Watch, residents in Villa Estadio have reported property damage, illegal waste disposal, and health problems caused by the mine's activities and possible violations of environmental regulation.

In 2021, the country's environmental authorities took action against the mine because its blasting increased air pollution, which could harm the health of nearby residents. The mine's activities raised a lot of concerns about air quality and possible respiratory issues, according to Reuters. These problems added up have caused frustration and led to protests from the local communities.

These ongoing issues have caused growing frustration in the nearby community, and local people are demanding stricter environmental rules and emission regulations. These problems are complicated, telling how mining activities can inevitably affect the local environment and the health of nearby residents. Even though the Candelaria mine is important for Chile's economy since it brings large economic benefits to the country, its negative effects on local communities have led to calls for more responsible mining practices and greater transparency to reduce environmental injustice and social issues.
