= Ore concentrate =

Raw ore processed to concentrate the metal component

Ore concentrate, dressed ore or simply concentrate is the product generally produced by metal ore mines. The raw ore is usually ground finely in various comminution operations and gangue (waste) is removed, thus concentrating the metal component. The concentrate is then transported to various physical or chemical processes called hydrometallurgy, pyrometallurgy smelters, and electrometallurgy where it is used to produce useful metals.

Ore concentrates are classified as a hazardous cargo for shipping by the International Maritime Solid Bulk Cargoes (IMSBC) Code, which is part of the SOLAS Convention, due to their tendency under certain conditions, to liquefy, which may affect the stability of the ship due to the free surface effect potentially causing a ship to capsize. Special measures are required by the code in order to safely transport concentrates.

The process of pre-contrating ore is one in which relatively coarse sterile material is discarded to avoid the cost of having it being milled and being discarded later as tailings.

== See also ==
- Beneficiation – Process of separating commercially valuable minerals from their ores
- Refining (metallurgy) – Process of purifying metals
