= Mining in Chile =

Regulatory authority
- Authority: National Geology and Mining Service; Ministry of Mining

Production
- Commodity: Lithium ▲56,000 tonnes; Copper ▼5.3 million tonnes; Gold ▲31.861 tonnes (1.0244 million troy ounces); Iron ore ▲11,443.4 million tonnes; Silver ▲1,400 tonnes (45 million troy ounces); Iodine ▲23,000 tonnes; Iron ore ▲19,000 tonnes (Note: "Usable ore", if measured by iron content Chile produced an estimate of 12,000 tonnes of ore in 2025.)
- Year: 2025

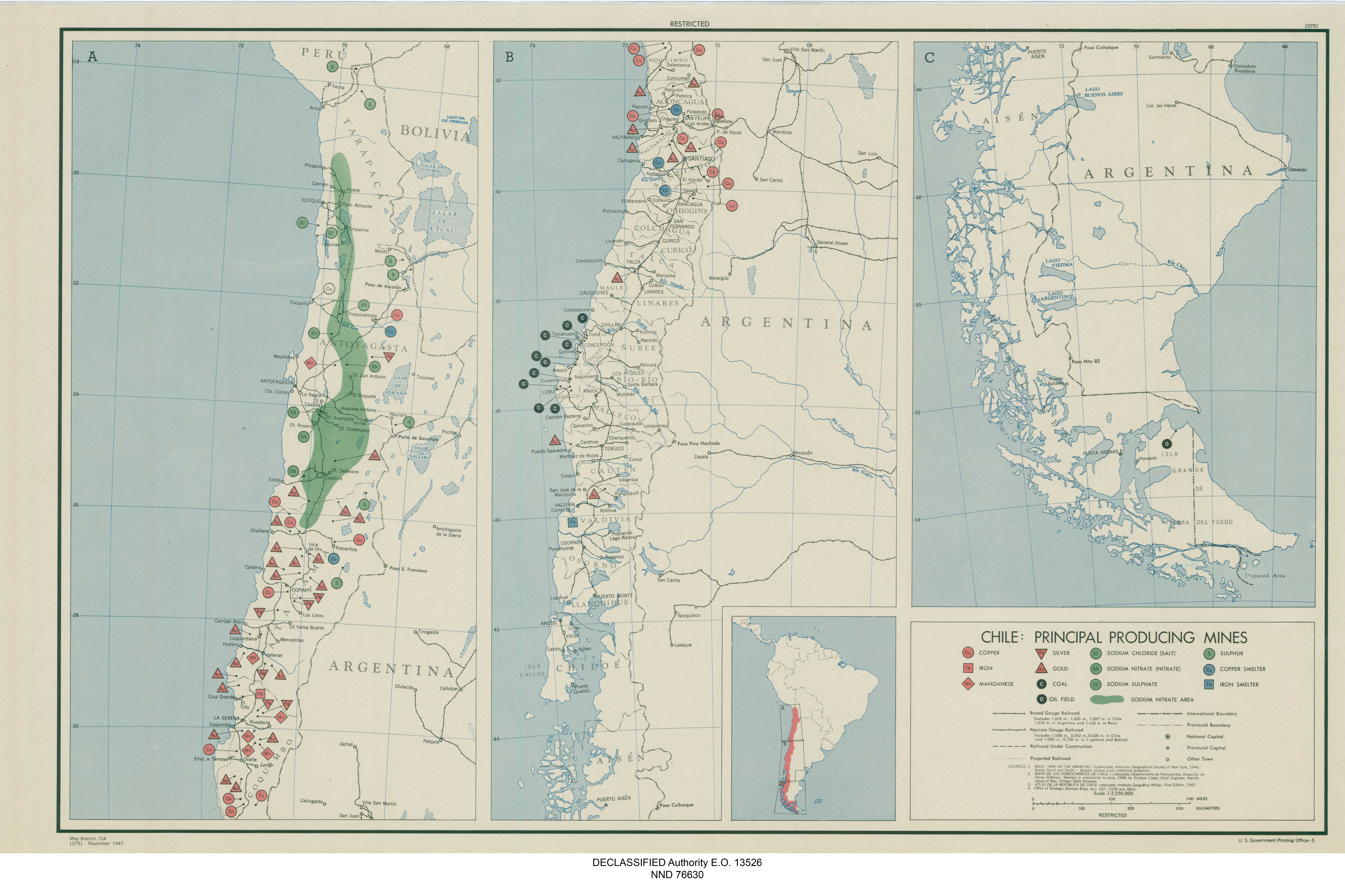
1947 map of mines in Chile

The mining sector in Chile has historically been and continues to be one of the pillars of the Chilean economy. Mining in Chile is concentrated in 14 mining districts, all of them in the northern half of the country and in particular in the Norte Grande region spanning most of the Atacama Desert.

Chile was, in 2025, the world's largest producer of copper, iodine and rhenium, the third largest producer of lithium and molybdenum, the fifth largest producer of salt, the sixth largest producer of silver, the ninth largest producer of potash, the thirteenth producer of sulfur and the fourteenth producer of iron ore in the world. As a by-product of copper mining Chile produces also large quantities of gold and silver, but there are also a number of mines extracting gold as their primary resource.

In 2021 mining taxes stood for 19% of the Chilean state's incomes. Mining stood for about 14% of gross domestic product (GDP) but by estimates including economic activity linked to mining it stood for 20% of GDP. About 3% of Chile's workforce work in mines and quarries but in a wider sense about 10% of the country's employment is linked to mining.

The governance of mining in Chile is done by non-overlapping bodies; the Chilean Copper Commission, ENAMI, the National Geology and Mining Service (SERNAGEOMIN) and the Ministry of Mining. SONAMI and Consejo Minero are guilds associations grouping corporate mining interests in Chile. Chile's National Statistics Institute reports on the state of the mining industry through the monthly publication of the Mining Production Index.

Some challenges of the Chilean mining industry come from overall mine aging, remoteness and harsh climatic conditions of mining in the high Andes, (Note: Many batteries used in mining have a limited performance in cold environments. Also, for mines in the high Andes there are logistical difficulties in the use of sea water, in addition to increased probabilities of extreme weather events that may disrupt water supply.) and increased water demand coupled with water scarcity. (Note: 20 of Chile's 24 desalination plants provide water for the mining industry.) Other challenges are related to increasingly complex legal frameworks or the fact that important mineral deposits lie below or next to glaciers along the Argentina–Chile border and have thus both issues relating to the bi-nationality and of environmental impacts on glaciers and rock glaciers.

== Copper ==
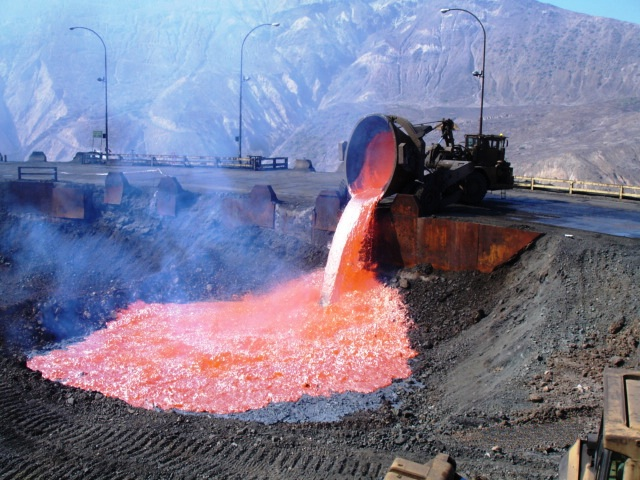
Slag disposal from the copper smelter of Caletones next to El Teniente, an underground copper mine in the Andes of Central Chile (2005)

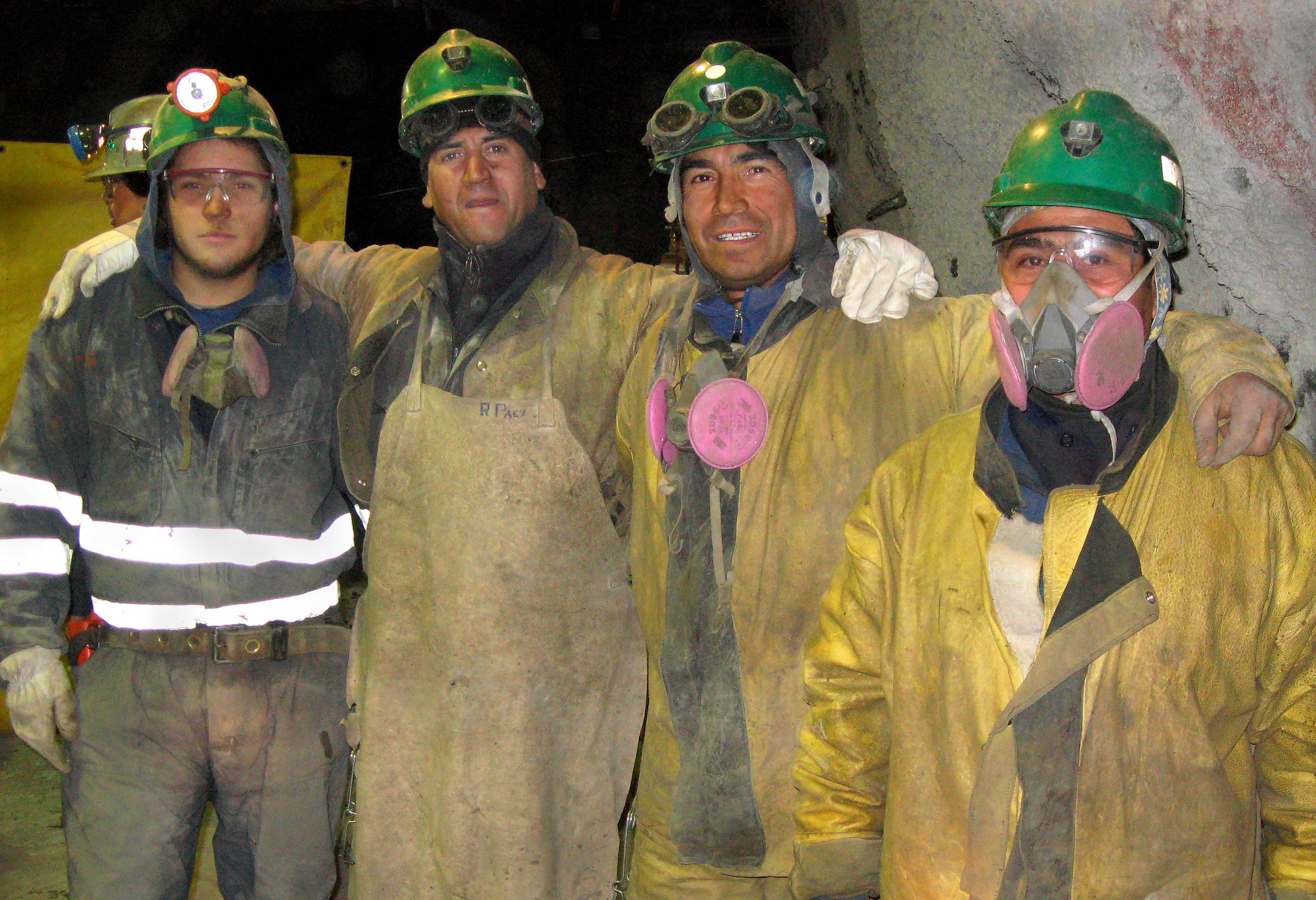
Chilean copper miners

Chile is the world's largest producer of copper and has been so uninterruptedly since 1983. This activity provides a substantial part of the Chilean state's revenue: slightly less than 6% in 2020, with state-owned copper company Codelco alone generating 2.6% of state revenue.

Mining of copper in Chile is done chiefly on giant low-grade porphyry copper deposits. As of 2023 the most productive copper mine is Escondida owned by BHP, Rio Tinto and two other private companies and located in inland Antofagasta Region.

Part of the state's income from copper mining goes to the Economic and Social Stabilization Fund which is since 207 the successor to the Copper Stabilization Fund established in 1987. This fund allows for more precise annual government budget planning given that copper prices can exhibit strong fluctuations.

== Lithium ==
Northern Chile forms part of the Lithium Triangle with substantial reserves in the form of brine. The explosive growth in electric vehicles since 2015 has triggered increased demand.

Chile is the main producer of lithium from brine. Until 2017, when it was surpassed by Australia, Chile was the over-all main producer of lithium. Estimates show that Chile is expected to be surpassed also by Argentina and China in lithium production by 2030. Lithium-expert Gustavo Lagos suggests that lithium production in Chile will by 2030 represent be about 8% of the world's total production. Chile has the world's cheapest production costs for lithium and this could be an advantage for mining in Chile once recycled lithium enters the market competing with costly mining operations in the future.

Most of Chile's lithium reserves are in Salar de Atacama and Salar de Maricunga, and all lithium extracted in Chile as of 2023 comes from Salar de Atacama. The only two lithium-extracting companies currently operating in Chile, SQM and Albemarle, have licences to extract lithium until 2030 and 2043 respectively. In April 2023 Chilean government announced plans for nationalizing its lithium industry. The state-owned copper company Codelco was commissioned by the government to negotiate nationalization with SQM.

== Gold ==
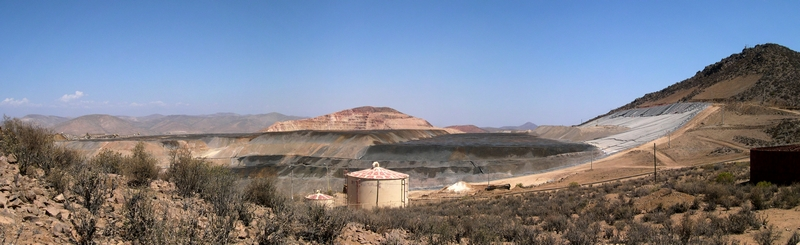
Gold mine in Andacollo.

The amount of gold mined in Chile has fluctuated in the 2010–2023 period from a high of 50,852 kg in 2013 to a low of 30,907 kg in 2022. Also in the same period 36% to 72% of the gold produced annually in Chile was a by-product of copper mining. The share of medium and small-scale mining in gold production in Chile has dropped from an average of 45% for the 2003–2005 period to 9% in 2023.

Most of the economically viable gold deposits in Chile belong to two types of deposits; high-sulfidation epithermal and porphyry type. Most of these deposits formed in the last 66 millions years (Cenozoic) in connection to magmatic activity in the Andes. Gold from iron oxide copper gold ore deposits (IOCG), from mesothermal deposits, or of Mesozoic age (formed 66 to 252 million years ago) may in some cases be recurrent geological features but lack often large concentrations to make them profitable. Almost all valuable non-placer gold in Chile occur in the northern half of the country and some deposits are grouped into belts like the Maricunga Gold Belt and El Indio Gold Belt.

Almost no mining of placer gold occurs today. The placer deposits of some areas of difficult access in Patagonia are subject to sporadic small-scale illegal gold mining. A 2019 study found that seven of Chile's ten best placer gold prospects lie around Cordillera de Nahuelbuta.

== Iron ==
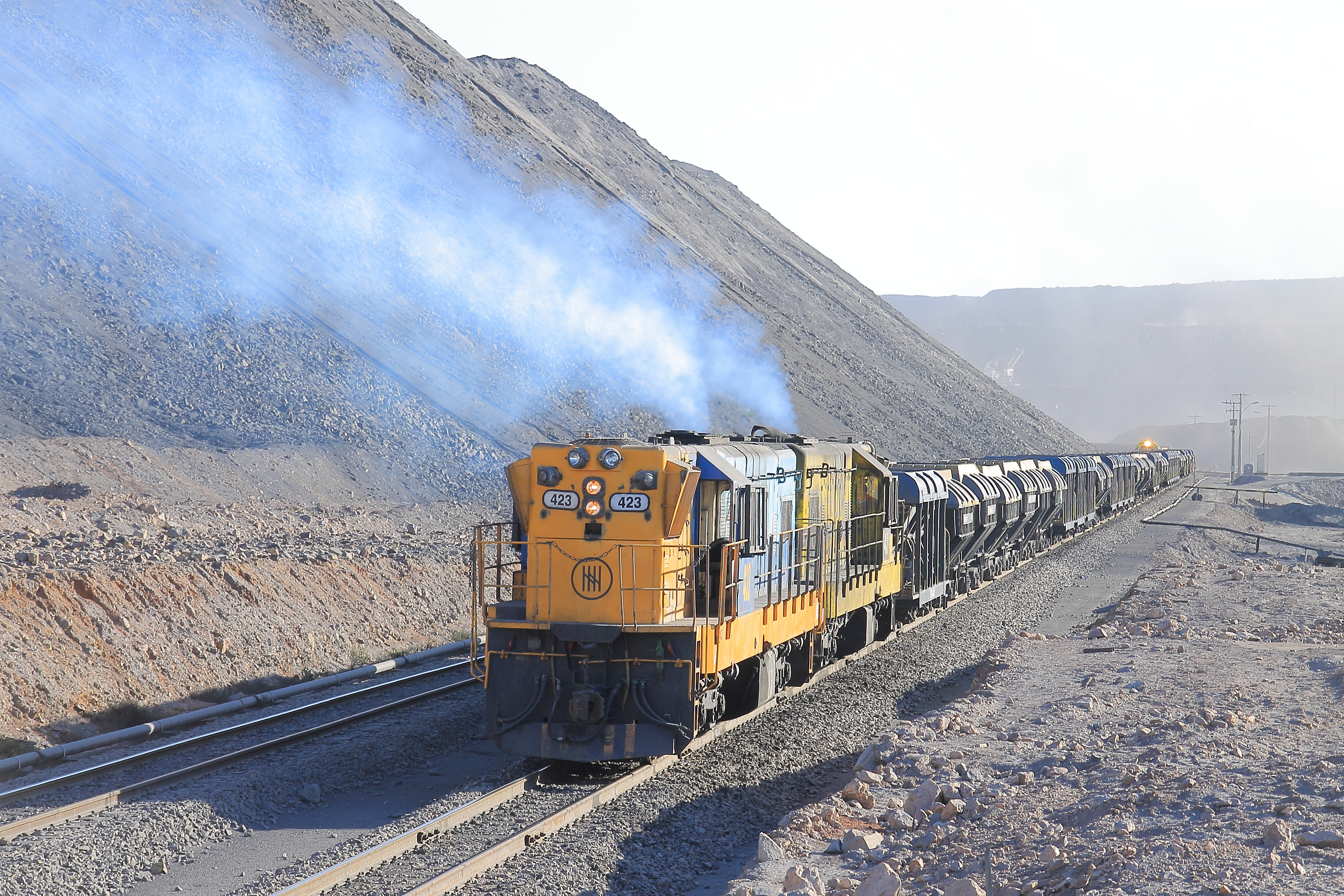
Train moving iron ore in the industrial area of Los Colorados mine.

Since at least 2010 Chile's has each year produced 0.6% to 0.7% of all iron mined in the world. Production has risen from 6.8 million metric tonnes in 2010 to more than 10 million metric tonnes each year beginning 2021. Mining of iron ore deposits along the Chilean Iron Belt have been facilitated by their proximity to the ports of export at the coast, and this had in particular had an impact for the economic viability of small iron ore deposits. Compañía Minera del Pacífico (CMP) is largest iron mining company in Chile. Is through its parent company Compañía de Acero del Pacífico (CAP) a member of Consejo Minero, a guild of large mining companies in the country. Compañia Minera del Pacífico has three main mines each with its own port for export. Near Copiapó the company owns Cerro Negro Norte mine which uses the port of Punta Totoralillo, further south the company is in ownership of Los Colorados mine which uses the port of Guacolda II, and near the city of La Serena El Romeral mine is operated using the port of Guayacán in Coquimbo.

In medium-scale iron mining in Chile the mines and deposits of El Carmen, Huantemé, Cerro Imán and El Dorado have been important in the second half of the 20th century.

The Dominga project led by Andes Iron seeks to establish a new iron and copper mine near the coast of northern Coquimbo Region. This project has proved controversial for political and environmental reasons.

== Iodine and nitrate ==
In the Atacama Desert in northern Chile there are vast superficial deposits of caliche, a mixture of gypsum, sodium chloride and other salts, and sand. It is associated to the mineral nitratine also known as "Chile saltpeter" (Spanish: salitre). The deposits contain an average of 7.5% sodium nitrate, as well as sodium sulfate (18.87%), sodium chloride (4.8%), and smaller amounts of potassium, calcium, magnesium, borate, iodine, and perchlorate. About two-thirds of the deposits are insoluble gangue minerals. The caliche beds are from 2 cm to several meters thick in alluvial deposits, where the soluble minerals form a cement in unconsolidated regolith. Nitrate-bearing caliche is also found permeating bedrock to form bedrock deposits.

Nitratine is a composite of sodium nitrate (NaNO_{3}) and potassium nitrate (KNO_{3}). Nitratine was an important source of export revenue for Chile until World War I, when Europe began to produce both nitrates industrially in large quantities. Mining nitrate in the Far North of Chile was arguably the main economic activity of the country from 1880 to 1930.

Caliche is the main iodine ore in Chile and the country is the world's prime producer of this element in addition to hosting over half of the worlds reserves of iodine. SQM and Cosayach are Chile's first and second largest iodine producers. Iodine at SQM is extracted from caliche ore and requires also the consumables sulphur, ammonium nitrate, sulfuric acid, kerosene, water, electricity and fossil fuel, mainly diesel.

== Other minerals ==
Since the late 1970s, the production of gold and silver has increased greatly. The lead, iron and petroleum industries have shrunk since the mid-1970s, the result of both adverse international market conditions and declines in the availability of some of these resources. With a combined total value of about US$4 billion, two of the largest investments planned in Chile in the early 1990s were designated for an aluminium smelters projects in the Puerto Aisén and Strait of Magellan areas.

In the 2005–2024 period more than half of the silver produced annually in Chile was a by-product of copper mining.

=== Coal ===
Historically, coal mining had some importance in the southern half of the country from the 1850s to the 1990s with a brief revival in Invierno mine from 2013 to 2020.

=== Cobalt ===
There is no primary mining of cobalt in Chile with the last activity ending in 1944. Cobalt resources are known from the Chilean Iron Belt near the coast of Coquimbo and Atacama regions and in the site of El Volcán in Cajón del Maipo in the Andes near Santiago. Cobalt is a potential by-product of iron and copper mining along the iron belt. It is known to be found in considerable concentrations among discarded material –mainly tailings– of copper, iron and gold mining in Chile. Capstone Copper's mines of Mantoverde and Santo Domingo are thought to be able to produce battery-grade cobalt.

=== Manganese ===
There is no manganese mining in Chile since 2009 when Empresa Manganeso Atacama ceased operations. Until then about half of the Chilean manganese had been exported to Argentina, and mining was mainly done in underground mines. Historically Corral Quemado and other areas of Coquimbo Region have produced most manganese in Chile. Manganese mining in Chile and Corral Quemado had a strong peak in 1943 when it came to produce more of what was being purchased leading to large stockpiles accumulating in ports and railway stations and ultimately to a halt in mining and thus mass unemployment. Transport costs have been a comparative disadvantage for the commercialization of manganese mined in Chile. The area around Taltal was second to Corral Quemado in importance in manganese mining in the 1940s. Known manganese deposits are scattered along the length of Chile from Arica (18.5° S) to Valdivia (39.5° S). In detail, the known manganese deposits concentrate in three areas; the Altiplano in northernmost Chile, the Coquimbo and Atacama regions and the metasedimentary rocks of the provinces of Cautín and Valdivia. In the regions of Coquimbo and Atacama manganese appear as stratabound layers in the Cretaceous volcanic and sedimentary formations of Arqueros and Quebrada Marquesa. In Arqueros Formation it occurs in some locations together with stratabound copper. By 1964 87% of the magnesium mined in Chile came from these formations in Coquimbo Region.

=== Rare-earth metals ===
While relatively unexplored for rare-earth metal Chile's main resources have been identified as of 2026 to lie in the commune of Penco near the coast in central Chile and in the Norte Chico between Coquimbo and Copiapó. Since at least 2016 the company Aclara Resources has been developing plans to commercially exploit rare-earth metals in Penco. As of March 2026 its environmental impact assessment was under evaluation by the Environmental Assessment Service. If approved the mine is planned to produce an average of 811 tons of RRE-oxides. About 60 km south of Penco regolith formed from granites of the Coastal Batholith of central Chile in Cordillera de Nahuelbuta have been investigated as a source of rare-earth metals. North of Penco NeoRe and Chilean Cobalt Corp have together explored for REE in the coastal communes of Chanco, Cobquecura and Pelluhue.

Old tailings from the mining of other resources have also been identified as potential sources of rare-earth metals in Chile.

== Medium-scale mining ==
Location of mining districts where medium-scale mining is dominant.

Most medium-scale mining is concentrated near roads or other pre-existing infrastructure, and lie thus away from the high Andes where nearly all mines belong to the large-scale mining category. The mining districts of Chañaral, Copiapó, Huasco and Andacollo have most of their mining done by medium-scale mining companies. The state-owned enterprise ENAMI has among its goals supporting medium-scale mining. Medium-scale mining has a larger share of mining properties in the country as whole, and in Atacama Region in particular, relative to large-scale mining that is dominant in the regions of Tarapacá and Antofagasta.

Medium-scale mining in Chile tends to focus on copper and produced about 4.5% of the copper mined in the country from 2017 to 2021. In that period the copper extracted by medium-scale mining increased each year starting from 256 kt in 2017 ato 313 kt in 2021. Besides copper other medium-scale mining activity in Chile involve gold, iron, zinc and lead. The amount and share of the gold mined by small and medium scale mining in Chile has declined significantly from 2003 to 2023. In iron mining El Carmen mine near Chañaral is a leading medium-scale producer. According to figures from 2013 all zinc and lead mining in Chile was done by medium and small-scale miners.

Most mineral exploration efforts by medium-scale mining are done near established mines (brownfield exploration), and as of 2023 about three quartes of these exploration projects are for copper and the remaining for gold.

Some medium-scale mining companies in Chile are Grupo Minero Las Cenizas (copper), Sierra Atacama (copper), (Note: Sierra Atacama SpA operations the underground copper mine of Sierra Atacama about 65 km from the port city of Antofagasta. 93% of the shares of the mine are owned by Minera Salar Blanco which is in turn owned by Chilean businessman Martín Borda mongo, Lithium Power International and Bearing Lithium Corp.) Haldeman Mining (copper and gold), (Note: Michilla, Tambo de Oro and Longacho.) Cosayach (iodine) and Santa Fe Mining (iron).

== Small-scale mining ==
As with medium-scale mining, small scale mining concentrates in lowlands and the lower elevations of the Andes, usually near roads or other relevant infrastructure. The number of artisan miners in Chile, often known as pirquineros, has varied widely over the years. Since 2000 in some years with high metal prices have had up to c. 14,000 small-scale miners active. On average 95% of small-scale miners work in copper mining. These miners are supported by ENAMI which processes copper ore it purchases at stabilized prices. The levels of illegal mining in Chile are low relative to neighbouring countries.

== Water use ==
The Chilean Copper Commission projects that by 2033 the water supply to mining in Chile industry will consist of 71% of sea water and 29% from continental waters.

== Tailings ==
Chile hosts as of 2025 836 tailings deposits of which 627 are inactive and 53 are abandoned. The remaining is ctailings, 129 are actively used by mines. Some companies like Minera Valle Central and Compañía Minera del Pacífico processes the tailings of third parties. Minera Valle Central processes the tailings of El Teniente and recovers molybdenum and copper. Planta Magnetita of Compañía Minera del Pacífico processes tailings from Candelaria copper mine and some ore of Los Colorados iron mine.

From 1978 to 2010 Planta de Pellets in Huasco disposed its tailings legally in the sea, being the only marine disposal of tailings in Chile.

== History ==
The history of mining in Chile spans more than thousand years, with early copper mining in Chiquicamata dating to the 6th century and cultures and groups such as the El Molle, Diaguita and Mapuche mining or using gold adornments well before the Inca invasion in the 15th century. The successive establishment of Inca and Spanish rule in the northern half of Chile intensified mining and brought new techniques to the industry. In the early Spanish period (1542–1600) there was significant mining of gold placers which fueled Spanish–Mapuche conflict climaxing with a collapse of Spanish rule in the foremost gold district and a reorentation of Spanish economy towards agriculture. Gold, silver and copper mining had a resurgence in the late colonial period (18th century). Exports of silver and copper were instrumental to finance the Chilean War of Independence (1810–1826) and then to prevent Chile defaulting in its independence debt the 1830s and 1840s. In the 19th century Chile was a major producer of silver (1830s to 1850s) and copper (1850s to 1870s), but towards the end of the century mining of gold, silver and copper were in decline. An exception to this was the Tierra del Fuego gold rush (1883–1906) in southernmost Chile. Coal and iron mining in Chile took off in the mid-19th century and early 20th century respectively. From 1870 to the 1930 nitrate mining in the far north was an immerse source of wealth and employment in Chile. Modern copper mining in Chile begun in the 1900s and 1910s with the arrival of companies from the United States which were fully nationalized by 1971 under the state-owned copper company Codelco. A new wave of foreign investment of mining begun following the Decreto Ley 600 law of 1974 and by the 1990s the country was experiencing a new mining boom.

== See also ==
- Geology of Chile
- Law on Mining Concessions
- List of copper smelters in Chile

== Bibliography ==
- Andrade, Sebastián; Muñoz, Felipe; Salazar, Reinaldo (2025). Distritos productivos para el desarrollo de la minería chilena [Productive districts for the development of mining in Chile] (Report) (in Spanish). Centro de Estudios y Documentación Mineros de SONAMI.
- Camus, Francisco (2005). "La minería y la evolución de la exploración en Chile". In Lagos, Gustavo (ed.). Minería y desarrollo (in Spanish). Santiago, Chile: Ediciones Universidad Católica de Chile. pp. 229–270. ISBN 956-14-0844-9.
- Ceballos, Juan Ignacio; Tilton, John (2005). "Análisis del Fondo de Compensación del Cobre Chile". In Lagos, Gustavo (ed.). Minería y desarrollo (in Spanish). Santiago, Chile: Ediciones Universidad Católica de Chile. pp. 295–318. ISBN 956-14-0844-9.
- COCHILCO (2024). Informe Consumo de Agua en la Minería del Cobre: Actualización al año 2023 (PDF) (Report) (in Spanish).
- Guajardo, Juan Carlos; Marañón, Matías; Ciudad, Juan Cristóbal; del Mauro, Bastián; Nicolás, Muñóz; Fiorella, Ulloa (2023). Caracterización de la mediana minería en Chile [Characterization of medium-scale mining in Chile] (PDF) (Report) (in Spanish). Centro de Estudios y Documentación Mineros de SONAMI.
- Millán, Augusto (1999). Historia de la minería del hierro en Chile (in Spanish). Santiago de Chile: Editorial Universitaria. ISBN 956-11-1499-2.
- Sagredo, Rafael (2005). "Chile, país minero". In Lagos, Gustavo (ed.). Minería y desarrollo (in Spanish). Santiago, Chile: Ediciones Universidad Católica de Chile. pp. 271–294. ISBN 956-14-0844-9.
- Salazar, Gabriel; Pinto, Julio (2002). Historia contemporánea de Chile III. La economía: mercados empresarios y trabajadores. LOM Ediciones. ISBN 956-282-172-2.
- Sutulov, Alexander (1975). "Antecedentes históricos de la producción de cobre en Chile". In Sutulov, Alexander (ed.). El Cobre Chileno (in Spanish). Corporación Nacional del Cobre de Chile. pp. 1–62.
- Townley, Brian; Díaz, Alejandro; Luca, Rodrigo (2017). Estado del arte y potenciales recursos Co y Mn en Chile (Report) (in Spanish). Advanced Mining Technology Center.
  - Townley, Brian; Díaz, Alejandro; Luca, Rodrigo (2017b). Exploration and mining potential for cobalt mineral resources in Chile (Report). (executive summary in English)
- Ulloa Urrutia, Alfie; Contreras Biekert, José Luis; Gana Aravena, Joaquín; Miranda Toledo, Rodrigo; Chauveau Gerber, Paul; Villalobos Valenzuela, Fernando; Farías Soto, Javiera (2017). Productividad en la Gran Minería del Cobre (in Spanish). Comisión Nacional de Productividad. ISBN 978-956-7725-08-3.
- Villalobos, Sergio; Silva, Osvaldo; Silva, Fernando; Estelle, Patricio (1974). Historia De Chile (14th ed.). Editorial Universitaria. ISBN 956-11-1163-2.
