= Chilean nationalization of iron =

The nationalization of the Chilean iron mining and steelmaking industries was a process in which the Chilean government acquired control of the major local and foreign-owned section of the steelmaking and iron mining industry in the country.

The nationalization of iron occurred in parallel to the final stages of the much larger and lasting Chilean nationalization of copper.

== Conditions and events prior to the nationalization ==
Iron mining in Chile was largely restricted to El Tofo prior to the arrival of the Hungarian immigrants Andrés Andai and Emérico Letay who revolutionized the industry in the 1950s. The main mining companies founded by these immigrants were Compañía Minera Santa Fe and Compañía Minera Santa Bárbara.

The partial foreign ownership of Compañía Minera Santa Fe and its arrangements with American companies Phillip Brothers and Isbrandtsen were subject a harsh criticism from socialist Senator Aniceto Rodríguez in the National Congress of Chile in 1966. More specifically Rodríguez criticized that Phillip Brothers owned a large part of the stocks of Compañía Minera Santa Fe and also owned CAFORE that purchased the ore and that the sales were thus an internal operation. Rodríguez took the occasion of this speech in the congress in 1966 to call to nationalize the iron mining industry. In the same yeart the poor working conditions in the iron mine of Sositas –in which Daniel Farkas was identified as being in charge– were denounced in the National Congress of Chile by Senator Julieta Campusano.

Compañia Minera Santa Bárbara bought Compañía Minera Santa Fe in 1967.

At the onset of the nationalization the largest iron mining operations in Chile were El Algarrobo of Compañía de Acero del Pacífico (CAP) and El Romeral of Bethlehem Chile Iron Mines. Together these companies mined 50% of all iron in Chile. Compañía Minera Santa Fe and Compañía Minera Santa Bárbara were in a trend of diminishing production in the early 1970s.

== Nationalization and aftermath ==
The government of Salvador Allende initiated the nationalization of steel production and iron mining in Chile by taking control of CAP. To achieve this minister of economy Pedro Vuskovic reached a purchase agreement with the owners of CAP in December 1970. CAP, then transformed into a state-owned company, purchased the property of Bethlehem Chile Iron Mines, and Compañía Minera Santa Bárbara. Further, after a 1971 government decree that declared all mining concessions of iron ore deposits that were not being mined expired, CAP acquired the properties of El Laco, Cerro Negro Norte, Los Colorados and many other prospects.

The owners of Compañía Minera Santa Bárbara negotiation a favoruable sale and the company was merged into CAP. With the expropriation of the assets of Bethlehem Chile Iron Mines CAP came to control the mines of El Tofo and El Romeral. The acquisition of El Romeral proved with time to be a good business as a diamond drilling campaign that started in 1973 and a 1976 magnetometric study showed according to a 1979 analysis that the reserves of El Romeral were far larger than previously believed and larger than those of El Algarrobo.

In the same way, we have nationalized coal, we have acquired the shares of Compañía de Acero del Pacífico, which were in the hands of national and foreign private individuals, and Compañía de Acero del Pacífico (CAP) will be the vital center of the entire iron production and industrialization process. Therefore, at this moment, this company, an expression of the Chilean state, is proposing the nationalization of the minerals in the El Tofo and El Romeral areas, which are in the hands of foreign capital.

— Salvador Allende, January 28, 1971, La Serena, Chile.

CAP was privatized in 1982, and made into a holding company with mining operations carried out by its subsidiary Compañía Minera del Pacífico (CMP). This company stood for 99% of Chilean iron exports as of 2022.

== Bibliography ==
- Danús, Hernán (2007). "IV. La minería del hierro y la industria siderúrgica". Crónicas mineras de medio siglo (1950-2000) (in Spanish). Santiago de Chile: RIL Editores. ISBN 978-956-284-555-7.
- Jancsó, Katalin (2018). "Húngaros en la industria minera de Chile". Encuentros Europa-Iberoamérica en un mundo globalizado (in Spanish). Budapest: Centro Iberoaméricano, Universidad de Pécs. ISBN 978-615-5848-04-9.
- Millán, Augusto (1999). Historia de la minería del hierro en Chile (in Spanish). Santiago de Chile: Editorial Universitaria. ISBN 956-11-1499-2.
