= El Laco =

Volcanic complex in the Antofagasta Region, Chile

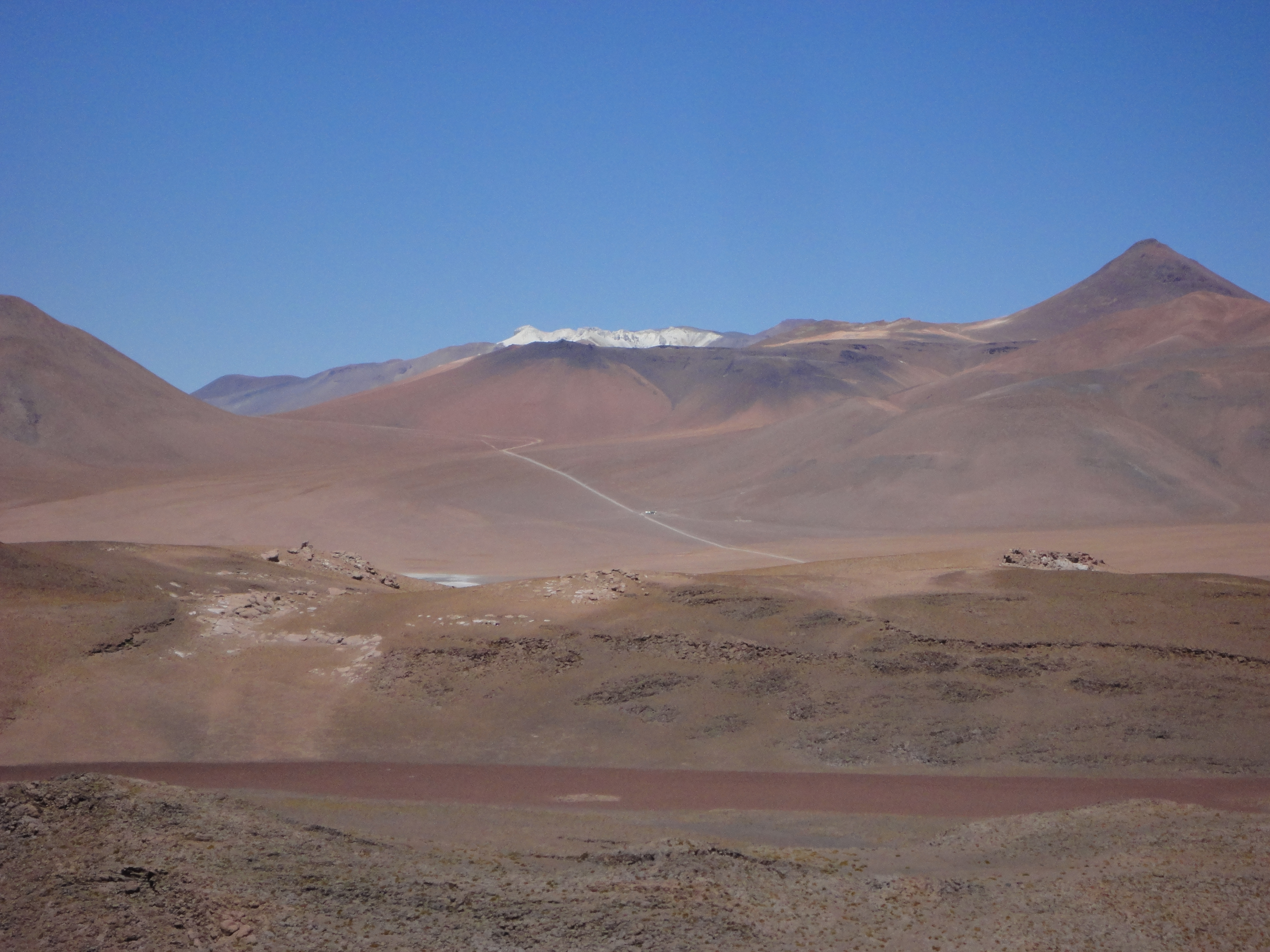
- The conical summit to the right is named Pico El Laco. The black zones to the left of it are Cerro Laco Sur and Cerro Laco Norte. The image shows only about half of the volcanic complex.

Highest point
- Elevation: 5,325 m (17,470 ft)

Geography
- Location within Chile

El Laco is a volcanic complex in the Antofagasta Region of Chile. It is directly south of the Cordón de Puntas Negras volcanic chain. Part of the Central Volcanic Zone of the Andes, it is a group of seven stratovolcanoes and a caldera. It is about two million years old. The main summit of the volcano is a lava dome called Pico Laco, which is variously reported to be 5,325 metres (17,470 ft) or 5,472 metres (17,953 ft) high. The edifice has been affected by glaciation, and some reports indicate that it is still fumarolically active.

The volcano is known for its magnetite-containing lava flows of enigmatic origin. In total, there are four lava flows and two dykes, as well as a formation of uncertain nature. In addition to lava flow structures, pyroclastics containing iron oxide are also found within the complex. Whether the iron-rich lavas are native magnetite lavas or were formed by hydrothermal processes acting on regular rock is under debate. After their discovery in 1958, these iron deposits have been mined. The latest mining activity have been carried out by Compañía Minera del Pacífico from 1988 to 1996. Mining ended in 1996 as consequence of low price of iron in addition to the stop of purchases from Altos Hornos Zapla of Fabricaciones Militares in Argentina.<

Similar deposits of volcanic iron oxide exist in Australia, Chile, and Iran.

== Geography ==
El Laco is part of the Cordón de Puntas Negras sector of the Central Volcanic Zone, directly south of that volcanic chain. It sits atop a quartzite and sandstone basement that was lifted from the seaground during the Acadian orogeny and is of Ordovician age. Later, Mesozoic and Cenozoic sedimentation of the Salta Group occurred, which was then buried by Tertiary rhyolites. Two major volcanic lineaments cross in the El Laco area, including the so-called Calama-Olacapato-El Toro lineament. El Hueso volcano to the north is 5,028 metres (16,496 ft)-5,029 metres (16,499 ft) high and has a basement diameter of 2.5 kilometres (1.6 mi). It has a crater with a diameter of 1 kilometre (0.62 mi).

The city of Antofagasta is located 320 kilometres (200 mi) west of El Laco. Other close towns are Calama and San Pedro de Atacama. The international road through Sico Pass connecting Salta in Argentina with Calama in Chile runs close to El Laco. A number of tourist sites are found in the Atacama Desert adjacent to El Laco, and the dry climate also makes the area suitable for astronomy facilities.

== Geology ==
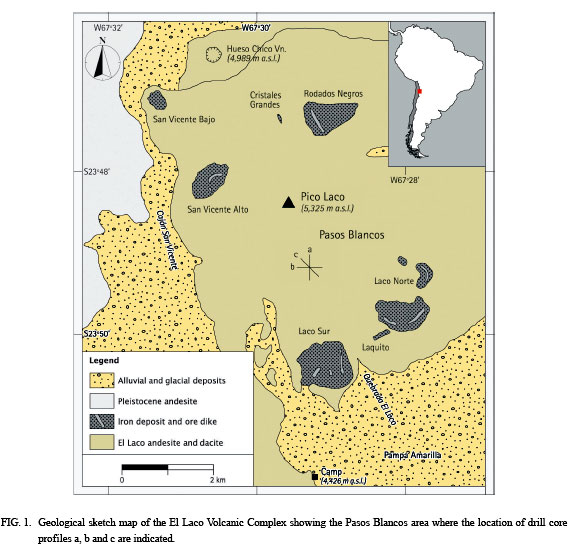
Geological map of El Laco

The El Laco volcanic complex is formed by about seven minor stratovolcanoes and lava domes. The complex started its activity in the Miocene-Pliocene, when porphyric andesites formed a stratovolcano. During the Pliocene, ash and pyroclastic eruptions formed a caldera with a diameter of 4–5 kilometres (2.5–3.1 mi), which also contains a central lava dome that formed 6.5 million years ago. Finally, probably during the Pleistocene, five iron-rich magmas were extruded, named Laco Sur, Laco Norte and Rodados Negros. Laquito and Cristales Grandes, two abyssal iron magma structures, date back to that era. The volcanic complex is located an altitude of 4,300–5,470 metres (14,110–17,950 ft) and covers a surface area of 7 by 5 kilometres (4.3 mi × 3.1 mi) with a minimum volume of 14 cubic kilometres (3.4 cu mi) of volcanic rock.

The main summit, Pico Laco or Pitón El Laco, has an altitude of 5,325 metres (17,470 ft), although a maximum height of 5,314 metres (17,434 ft) has also been reported. Pico Laco is an andesitic lava dome with a height of 400 metres (1,300 ft) above the surrounding terrain. The dome, with dimensions of 1.5 by 1 kilometre (0.93 mi × 0.62 mi), has two summits: the higher eastern one and a 5,166-metre (16,949 ft) western summit, and has also been described as a volcanic plug. Pico Laco has been described as a resurgent volcano within a caldera, that is surrounded by secondary vents.

Other summits include the northwestern Hueso Chico, a cone with a height of 120 metres (390 ft) above its surroundings and a crater 250 metres (820 ft) wide. This cone is of dacitic composition. "Volcano 5009" is heavily eroded, and its core of lava and hyaloclastite has been exposed. It has a diameter of 2.5 kilometres (1.6 mi). Eruptive activity here probably coincided with glacier activity during the Pliocene, as evidenced by moraines in the area.

Ages of 10.5 to 1.6 mya have been estimated via potassium-argon dating of the andesite lavas and subvolcanic rocks. An age of 5.3±1.9 mya on lavas in the northern part of the volcanic complex is the oldest obtained date. Other dating has resulted in ages of 3.9±1.3 mya for Pico Laco's dome, 3.8±0.9 mya for lavas beneath San Vicente Bayo, 3.7±0.9 mya for a lava front next to Laco Norte, 2.6±0.6 for Crystales Grandes, 2.1±0.4 for Hueso Chico, and 1.6±0.5 for "Volcano 5009". Cordon de Puntas Negras has younger dates. Another date from Pico Laco is 2.0±0.3 mya; one study suggested four separate episodes of volcano development. Hydrothermal alteration has also been described for lower portions of the volcanic pile and probably occurred because of gases escaping from intruded magma. Moraines found west of El Laco were generated by glaciation both on El Laco and Puntas Negras. Surface exposure dating has indicated ages of 226 and 287 ka for some ice-affected lavas Further, andesitic volcanism in neighbouring volcanoes has blanketed El Laco. Reports exist of continuing fumarolic activity and hot springs with the deposition of clay and other minerals.

== Iron-rich deposits ==
On the flank of the volcano, apatite, hematite, and magnetite deposits are found at altitudes of 4,600–5,200 metres (15,100–17,100 ft). but such material is also found in the form of tephra. concentrically around Pico Laco. They are named Cristales Grandes, Laco Norte, Laco Sur, Laquito, San Vicente Alto, San Vicente Bajo and Rodados Negros. The magnetite is classified as porphyry-like. Iron-rich zones also formed in tuffs and lavas. Magnetite in the subvolcanic bodies exists in more massive crystals. The iron-containing rocks include lava flows, ash, and lapilli, and are unique in the world; they were deemed a IUGS Geological Heritage Site in 2024.

=== Individual deposits ===
Of these deposits, Laco Norte is the largest and was probably separated from neighbouring Laquito by erosion. It is 60–90 metres (200–300 ft) thick and covers a surface area of 1,000 by 1,500 metres (3,300 ft × 4,900 ft). It was erupted from feeder dykes on its southern and eastern end and forms a table-shaped body on a spur, in the shape of a mesa. At Laco Norte, which may be a lava lake, a structure of five layers is found: a basal andesite, ore in pyroclastic form, magnetite lava, pyroclastics which contain ore, and andesite at the top. Laco Sur has a similar morphology and dimensions of 30–70 by 600 by 750 metres (98 ft–230 ft × 1,969 ft × 2,461 ft); it has been mined. San Vicente Alto is a spatter cone or lava flow on the upper parts of the volcano (30 by 320 by 480 metres (98 ft × 1,050 ft × 1,575 ft)), and San Vicente Bajo is probably a lava dome (250 by 390 metres (820 ft × 1,280 ft)). Laquito (150 metres (490 ft) long and 50 metres (160 ft) wide) and Rodados Negros (500 by 600 metres (1,600 ft × 2,000 ft)) appear to be dykes, while Cristales Grandes (80–100 metres (260–330 ft) long and up to 30 metres (98 ft) wide) is more likely a vein and generally shows signs of hydrothermal formation. A magnetic layer of rock spreads north from the volcano, and a large magnetite body has been modelled beneath Pasos Blancos. A magnetite-rich lava flow has been discovered on Cordon de Puntas Negras not far from El Laco.

=== Structure and appearance ===
The magnetite lavas are primarily aa lava, but other surface features are also found, including pahoehoe features. Columnar morphologies are found on the magnetite, implying that they cooled quickly. There is only one other place in the world where columnar magnetite has been found – Kiirunavaara, in Sweden. Centimeter-sized vesicles to meter-sized tubes coated on the inside by euhedral magnetite were formed in the lava by escaping volcanic gas. Both before and after the magnetite lavas, layers of magnetite-containing pyroclastics were erupted. A 0.5–2-metre (1 ft 8 in – 6 ft 7 in) aureole separates the magnetite rocks from the host rocks. The magnetite lava flows are 50 metres (160 ft) thick, the pyroclastics 30 metres (98 ft) and 20 metres (66 ft) respectively. The pyroclastic-like deposits are porous and fragile and show traces of stratification. The pyroclastics at Laco Sur contain spherules of magnetite as well as some blebs of destinezite. An age of 2.1±0.1 million years has been found for ore by fission track dating.

=== Origin ===
Temperatures estimated for the erupted rocks cover a wide range, with some exceeding 800 °C (1,470 °F). These rocks are of enigmatic origin, which may be magmatic-hydrothermal or magmatic, with the presence of lava bombs of magnetite lava and other evidence supporting the magmatic origin theory. Other viewpoints consider the texture and chemical composition of the rocks as evidence that metasomatism or hydrothermal replacement of andesitic rocks formed the magnetite "lavas". A third hypothesis envisages the crystallization of magnetite within a silicic magma and its subsequent extraction through flotation attached to volatile bubbles. The role of a post-magmatic fluid phase, which was inferred from inclusions in crystals, or of a combination of magmatic and hydrothermal mechanisms has also been suggested.

Some magnetite was oxidized to hematite, probably under the influence of rainwater as indicated by isotope analysis. Only a minor amount of hematite is primary. Isotope data indicate that the formation of this magnetite magma was accompanied by the segregation of plagioclase. This plagioclase may have generated the rhyodacite lava dome. An iron-phosphate-rich magma generated the magnetite lava flows after release of volatile substances. The magma was probably bordering on forming a two-phase melt containing nelsonite and rhyolite. A favourable tectonic context associated with the compression of the magma chamber and the presence of faults helped with the eruption of the magnetite. The magma formation probably occurred in a magma chamber. During the cooling of the magma, the ores formed. The segregation occurred at a shallow depth. as well as overcoming density-based constraints on the eruption of iron-rich magmas; the magma would later have forcefully degassed within the volcano. The ultimate origin of the El Laco iron may be subducted metal-containing sediment.

=== Human history and exploitation ===
These iron oxide deposits were found in 1958 and Andrés Andai's Compañía Minera Santa Fe surveyed the deposit in 1959. A more scientific description of the deposits came first in 1961. An economic geology study of 1967 identified six mineable subhorizontal orebodies each with a thickness of about 60 m and an ore grade of 64% iron. Probable reserves were estimated at 300 to 400 million metrics tons, albeit it was noted that the deposits had the drawback of being rich in phosphorus. As part of the Allende administration's Chilean nationalization of iron the prospect of El Laco became state-owned in 1971 when the government expired all mining concessions of iron ore deposits that were not being mined. In the 1970s the El Laco iron ore deposits were considered a possible opportunity to stimulate economic growth in the region. The Compañía Minera del Pacífico (CMP) had processing equipment at El Laco in 2009. The latest mining activity carried out by CMP started in 1988 following the installation of a crusher and begun an extraction of 600,000 tons ore annually that lasted until 1996. Mining ended in 1996 as consequence of low price of iron in addition to the stop of purchases from Altos Hornos Zapla of Fabricaciones Militares in Argentina.

It is estimated that the deposit contains 733.9 million tons of ore, consisting of 50% iron. The geological interest in these kinds of mineral deposits is enhanced by their frequent association with other minerals, as has been noted at Olympic Dam, Australia. Other magnetite-apatite ore deposits in the Andes are Incahuasi (10.3±0.8 mya), 26 kilometres (16 mi) southwest of El Laco next to the Argentina–Chile border, and Magnetita Pedernales (Tertiary), about 300 kilometres (190 mi) south-southwest of Laco. These have been held by some geologists to have a similar origin as those of the el El Laco.

=== Comparable deposits ===
The Kiruna magnetites in Sweden resemble the El Laco ones in terms of manganese and vanadium content, and their titanium content is comparably low. The deposits at Kiruna and El Laco have been classified as "Iron oxide-apatite" ore deposits, and El Laco is the best preserved and youngest such deposit on Earth. Other deposits of volcanic iron ore are Nenana in Alaska, the Chilean Iron Belt, the Tertiary Cerro el Mercado deposit in Mexico, the Eocambrian Bafq district in Iran, and the Proterozoic Kiruna field in Sweden. Of these, Sierra Bandera in the Chilean iron belt may be another example of surface volcanic iron ore rather than subvolcanic ore as is commonly assumed of these deposits. The similarity El Laco to the iron ores of the Chilean Iron Belt have been questioned by scientists who assert that the latter ores are of hydrothermal origin.

== Petrology ==
The main rocks of the volcano are andesite and dacite, which contain biotite and pyroxene as well as blebs containing iron oxide. The iron-containing rocks are a less important component. Other components are diopside pegmatites. The whole rock falls into the calc-alkaline class of volcanic rocks, similar to these erupted by the neighbouring volcanoes Lascar and Llullaillaco. The andesites contain plagioclase clinopyroxene, orthopyroxene, and phenocrysts of magnetite. Magnetite, and in lesser measure hematite, are the most abundant iron minerals; diopside, goethite, limonite, maghemite, pyrite, scapolite and diadochite are also found. Erupted magma was probably gas-rich, as the magnetite lavas would otherwise have melting points of over 1,500 °C (2,730 °F). The lavas lost most of their sulfur and phosphorus after their eruption. High oxygen-18 amounts in the Laco magmas indicate either crustal contamination or isotopic effects during fractional crystallization. Some atmospheric water influence has been inferred from isotope data as well.

Hydrothermal alteration of the central lava dome and iron-bearing deposits has generated alunite, anatase, bassanite, chlorite, copper veinlets, gypsum, illite, jarosite, kaolinite, labradorite, quartz, rutile, sanidine, smectite, sulfur and tridymite. Some of these minerals forms veins inside the rock. Vast regions of the volcano have been altered hydrothermally at temperatures of 200–250 °C (392–482 °F) Minor exhalation deposits are also found in the form of sulfates that sometimes conserve conduits. Red-coloured alteration halos occur in andesites adjacent to iron deposits, probably due to iron input.

== Environment ==
The vegetation in the area is primarily low bushland. Short-tailed chinchillas can be found at El Laco, one of the few occurrences of this threatened species in Chile.

El Laco has a classical cold mountain climate at the line between the dry Altiplano with summer precipitation and the hyper-arid Atacama Desert climate. A nearby weather station (23°45′S 67°20′W) at 4,500 metres (14,800 ft) altitude showed an average temperature of 2.3 °C (36.1 °F) in 1991, with strong short-term variability. Air humidity recorded in 1991 was 10–30%.
