= Andrés Andai =

Hungarian Chilean businessman in iron mining

Andrés Andai Zoltanovic
- Born: András Andai; 1905 or 1906
- Died: 1960; Chile
- Occupation: Businessman

András Andai better known by his hispanized name Andrés Andai Zoltanovic (b. 1905 or 1906, d. 1960) was a Hungarian Chilean businessman known for his contributions to medium-scale iron mining in Chile. Despite lacking a background in mining starting in 1952 in few years he extended a mining business through Compañía Minera Santa Fe that operated mines from Ovalle in the south to Chañaral in the north. Before his mining enterprises in the 1950s iron mining in Chile was largely restricted to the mine of El Tofo.

== Career ==
Andai arrived to Chile in 1948 as an exile after having his umbrella factory in Budapest expropriated. In Santiago, he established an import and export company named Mercantil Financiera with fellow Hungarian Emérico Letay who had arrived to Chile in 1950. In Santiago, his friend Alfredo Nency introduced him as a partner to an iron ore export business he and others planned.

Andai investigated briefly the iron ore found at Incahuasi, about 100 km north of La Serena. (Note: Some sources state he did so accompanied by Emérico Letay while others mention instead Álvaro Salinas and the Ecuadorian Raúl Buenaventura as companions.) In 1952, he went to the United States and secured a deal to provide United Steel with iron ore stones (Spanish: colpa) with ore grades higher than 62%. The attempt to mine iron ore boulders at the foothills of Pleito and Cristales near Incahuasi ended in failure. In part this has been attributed to the contracting of a workforce inexperienced in mining from Santiago and to logistical difficulties, in particular the poor conditions of the Chile Route 5 section known as cuesta Buenos Aires.

Andai then moved south to mine El Dorado near the town of Ovalle, which was connected by good roads to the port of Coquimbo and could provide a workforce of experienced miners. In October 1952, Andai embarked the shipment of 100,000 tons of ore. The opening and successful operation of El Dorado in the 1950s – producing 45,000 tons of ore per month for much of that decade– is considered to have paved the way for the rise of the medium-scale iron mining in Chile in the 1960s and 1970s. It was from the mining of El Dorado that Andai's main company, Compañía Minera Santa Fe emerged. Later, he would also establish the companies Compañía Minera Santo Domingo and Manganesos Chile.

In a second journey to the United States, Andai secured a deal with Isbrandtsen which became owner of 40% of Compañia Minera San Fe, financed the company and gained exclusive rights for the maritime transport of ore. Andai kept a 40% ownership of the company and Alfredo Nency and the Hungarian American Leslie Geiger owned the remaining 20%.

Compañía Minera Santa Fe subsequently expanded with numerous mining claims across Norte Chico from 1954 to 1959. In 1957, Andai secured an agreement with Letay, now his main competitor and the owner of Compañía Minera Santa Bárbara. In the agreement, Compañía Minera Santa Bárbara would keep mines and ore deposits in the Huasco River basin and Sante Fe would keep the rest of the country. The main mines exploited by Compañía Minera Santa Fe were Cerro Imán, El Carmen, Falda and El Dorado, which it never owned but rented. It was the El Carmen though which was the most productive mine exploited by Campañía Minera Santa Fe.

While still active but gravelly ill from a stomach cancer Andai sought in 1959 unsuccessfully to sell Compañía minera Santa Fe to steelmaking Compañía de Aceros del Pacífico (CAP). Andai died in 1960 at 54 years of age. After Andais death Philipp Brothers acquired a 90% ownership of Compañía Minera Santa Fe buying his stakes and those of Isbrandtsen, but depletion of the mines and low international ore prices generated a crisis in the company, and it was then sold to Letay's Compañía Minera Santa Bárbara.

== Leadership style ==
Andrés Andai was known for helping Hungarian immigrants in Chile by providing employment, and more generally he did also with people from Central and Eastern Europe. The main language in Andai's management office in Santiago was Magyar. Communication between the administration office in Santiago and the operations in northern Chile were done via radio, in Hungarian and often in the late evening or night. This favoritism, in particular when he assigned positions of command to poorly skilled immigrants caused resentment among the Chilean mining engineers he employed, among which there was a high turnover rate. In contrast, the practise of putting inexperienced compatriots in leadership positions did not exist in Letay's Compañía Minera Santa Barbára that despite being of smaller size was more efficient and mechanized than Compañia Minera Santa Fe.

Andai was also known to pay the highest salaries in the Chilean iron mining industry. Albeit regarded as a successful businessman, the many mining operations led by him were considered chaotic with Andai contributing to this by giving conflicting orders.

== Bibliography ==
- Danús, Hernán (2007). "IV. La minería del hierro y la industria siderúrgica". Crónicas mineras de medio siglo (1950-2000) (in Spanish). Santiago de Chile: RIL Editores. ISBN 978-956-284-555-7.
- Jancsó, Katalin (2018). "Húngaros en la industria minera de Chile". Encuentros Europa-Iberoamérica en un mundo globalizado (in Spanish). Budapest: Centro Iberoaméricano, Universidad de Pécs. ISBN 978-615-5848-04-9.
- Millán, Augusto (1996). Evaluación y factibilidad de proyectos mineros (in Spanish). Editorial Universitaria. ISBN 956-11-1241-8.
- Millán, Augusto (1999). Historia de la minería del hierro en Chile (in Spanish). Santiago de Chile: Editorial Universitaria. ISBN 956-11-1499-2.

== See also ==
- Hungarians in Chile
