= El Carmen mine =

Iron mine in Chile

El Carmen
- Location within Atacama Region Location within Chile
- Location: Atacama Region, Chile; 26°24′35″S 70°18′48″W
- Products: Iron
- Company: Compañía Minera Carmen

El Carmen is an iron mine in northern Chile about 50 km east of the port of Chañaral. The ore of the mine is one of various iron oxide-apatite (IOA) ores that are part of the north-south Chilean Iron Belt. In the ores extracted at El Carmen was have ore grades of 62 to 63% iron and is usually mixed with iron ores from other mines to dilute its high phosphorus content. Alongside Cerro Imán, Huantemé and El Dorado, El Carmen is considered the basis for the medium-scale iron mining in Chile.

The geology of the mine contain parts of massive magnetite ore as well as ore-rich gravels that are part of alluvial deposits.

Part of the mine is an open-pit and part of it is made of underground workings.

== Bibliography ==
- Danús, Hernán (2007). "IV. La minería del hierro y la industria siderúrgica". Crónicas mineras de medio siglo (1950-2000) (in Spanish). Santiago de Chile: RIL Editores. ISBN 978-956-284-555-7.
- Millán, Augusto (1999). Historia de la minería del hierro en Chile (in Spanish). Santiago de Chile: Editorial Universitaria. ISBN 956-11-1499-2.
