= El Tofo =

Iron mine in Chile

Coordinates: 29.45°S 71.25°W

El Tofo is an iron ore mine in the Chilean Norte Chico region. The mine lies in northern Coquimbo Region within a larger mining district known as the Chilean Iron Belt. Geologically El Tofo is an iron oxide-apatite deposit. Before Andrés Andai's Compañía Minera Santa Fe begun operations in El Dorado El Tofo was the sole iron mine of significance in Chile.

The first record of the iron ores of El Tofo dates to a 1840 study of Ignacy Domeyko. While the mine presents good geological aspects for 19th century mining geographical aspects made access difficult despite being close to the Pacific coast. The mine began to be exploited in 1870 but by 1955 mining diminished as the deposit were close to depletion. Subsequently the El Romeral mine was opened 30 km to the south in replacement. Compañía de Acero del Pacífico obtained the ownership of El Tofo and El Romeral in the early 1970s when it was nationalized during the Presidency of Salvador Allende. Later the ownership passed to Compañía Minera del Pacífico as it was privatized during the Pinochet dictatorship. As of 2017 El Tofo is not active.

== Bibliography ==
- Millán, Augusto (1999). Historia de la minería del hierro en Chile (in Spanish). Santiago de Chile: Editorial Universitaria. ISBN 956-11-1499-2.
