= Iron mining in Chile =

Location of some iron mines active in Chile.

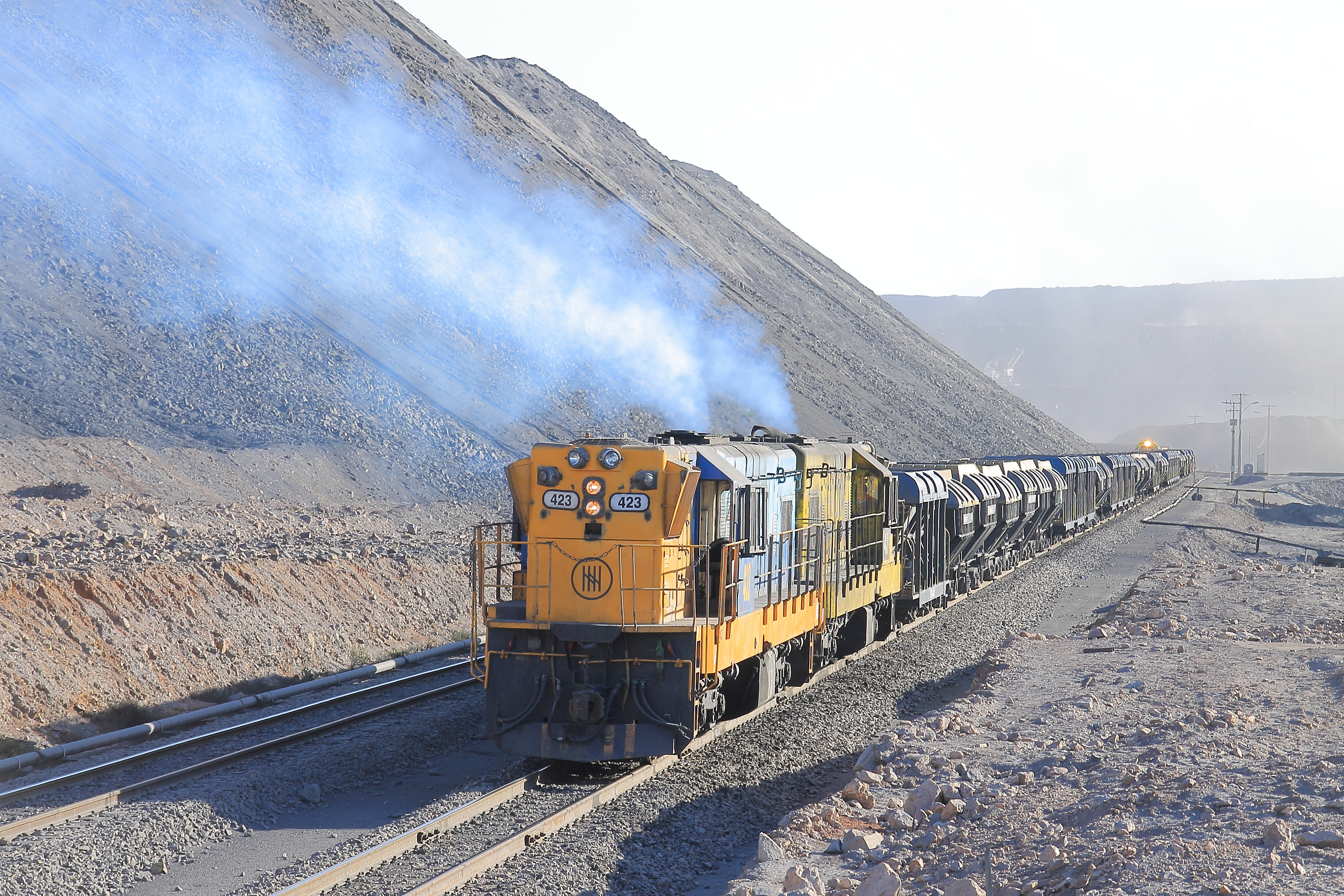
Train moving iron ore in the industrial area of Los Colorados mine.

Since at least 2010 Chile's has each year produced 0.6% to 0.7% of all iron mined in the world. Production has risen from 6.8 million metric tonnes in 2010 to more than 10 million metric tonnes each year beginning 2021. As of 2023 about 15% of the value of Chilean iron exports comes from iron ore pellets and the remaining from bulk ore. The northern regions of Atacama and Coquimbo hosts all iron mining in Chile. Until 2014 Antofagasta Region was also active in iron mining. In the 2014–2023 period iron ore has stood each year for 0.9 to 2.6% of the total value of Chilean exports. Most iron ore mined in Chile is exported to China and far behind South Korea and Bahrain are important markets.

Mining of iron ore deposits along the Chilean Iron Belt have been facilitated by their proximity to the ports of export at the coast, and this had in particular had an impact for the economic viability of small iron ore deposits. Compañía Minera del Pacífico (CMP) is the largest iron mining company in Chile and is through its parent company Compañía de Acero del Pacífico (CAP) the sole iron-mining member of Consejo Minero. Compañia Minera del Pacífico has three main mines each with its own port for export. Near Copiapó the company owns Cerro Negro Norte mine which uses the port of Punta Totoralillo, further south the company is in ownership of Los Colorados mine which uses the port of Guacolda II, and near the city of La Serena El Romeral mine is operated using the port of Guayacán in Coquimbo.

In medium-scale iron mining in Chile the mines and deposits of El Carmen, Huantemé, Cerro Imán and El Dorado are important.

The Dominga project led by Andes Iron seeks to establish a new iron and copper mine near the coast of northern Coquimbo Region. This project has proved controversial for political and environmental reasons.

Iron mining in Chile is thought to have the potential to produce cobalt as by-product.

Civil engineer Carlos Vattier and geologist Juan Brüggen were among the first to assess the ores of the Chilean Iron Belt in the late 19th century and early 20th century. Iron mining industry in the Chilean Iron Belt have had a significant presence of Chilean Hungarians entrepreneurs from the 1950s and up the Allende administration's 1971 nationalization of iron mining. Notable businessmen included Andrés Andai and Emérico Letay. In 2018 mine heir Leonardo Farkas, in control of Minera Santa Fe, was considered the last major Hungarian mining entrepreneur.

== Largest iron mines in Chile ==
Largest iron mines in Chile by production
Mine	Type	Tons of iron	Year of production	Year of opening	Owners	Sources
Cerro Negro Norte	Open-pit	4,000,000	2021	2010	Compañía Minera del Pacífico	
Los Colorados	Open-pit	2,559,000	2021	1997	Compañía Minera del Pacífico	
El Romeral	Open-pit	2,573,000	2021	1956	Compañía Minera del Pacífico	

== Geology ==
In Chile most economically viable iron ores are massive bodies of magnetite with secondary hematite and apatite. The shape of the ore bodies vary but is often lenticular or irregular, yet in other cases it form veins or stratiform deposits. With few exceptions these deposits lie along the Chilean Iron Belt. The iron ores are typically hosted by volcanic rocks of andesitic composition and of Early Cretaceous age (Neocomian). These ores are thought to have deposited in graben-like structures. Near the surface the magnetite tend to altered by weathering into hematite (martitization) and pyrite is weathered to limonite. Some hematite in the form of specularite that is found in the ores is primary though. Breccias containing low-grade ore are often found around the more massive high-grade ores. Various iron ore deposits have elongated and deep wedges of country rock identified as roof pendants.

The host rocks have typically secondary amphibolite, scapolite, biotite, chlorite that are the product of hydrothermal alteration or contact metamorphism.

== Bibliography ==
- Millán, Augusto (1999). Historia de la minería del hierro en Chile (in Spanish). Santiago de Chile: Editorial Universitaria. ISBN 956-11-1499-2.
- Ruiz, C.; Ortiz, F.; Moraga, A.; Aguilar, A. (1968). Genesis of the Chilean Iron ore Deposits of Mesozoic age. XXIII International Geological Conference. Vol. 7. Czechoslovakia. pp. 323–338.
