= Emérico Letay =

Hungarian Chilean businessman

Emérico Letay Altman
- Born: Imre Letay; 1909 or 1910
- Died: Chile
- Occupation(s): Businessman; Lawyer

Imre Letay better known by his hispanized name Emérico Letay Altman was a Hungarian Chilean businessman known for his contributions to medium-scale iron mining in Chile.

== Life ==
In Hungary he had a career as lawyer earning a doctorate from Pázmány Péter University in law and economics in 1938.

He arrived to Santiago in Chile in 1950 aged 40 years and associated with fellow Hungarian businessman Andrés Andai who had arrived two years prior after his umbrella factory in Budapest was expropriated. Initially both ran an export and import business. He entered the mining business when Andai was invited by Alfredo Nency to become a partner in an iron ore export business project. Andai and Letay investigated briefly the iron ores found around Incahuasi, about 100 km north of La Serena. Over time the two grew distant but remained in the iron mining business.

Letay and the Hungarian brothers Francisco and José Klein (Note: The brothers were successful businessmen that ran a grocery store and chocolate factory in addition to having shares in Banco Israelita. Being the nephew of the Klein brothers Leonardo Farkas inherited later Compañía Minera Santa Bárbara and Compañia Minera Santa Fe.) established Compañía Minera Santa Bárbara and had the ores of Huantemé, which they rented, near Huasco as their first mine. Soon however they entered into conflict with Andai's Compañía Minera Santa Fe that was expanding at many locations across northern Chile from 1954 to 1959. In 1957 Letay secured an agreement with Andai in which Compañía Minera Santa Bárbara would keep mines and ore deposits in the Huasco River basin and Sante Fe would keep the rest of the country. Metalmine, a company of Letay's nephew Jorge Kemeny Letay, (Note: Kemeny was a mechanical engineer who first established the company Metalmine and later Compañía Minera San Esteban that ran the mine of San José near Copiapó. This mine, then under ownership of one of Kemeny's sons, became known worldwide for an accident in 2010 in which 33 miners were trapped.) was the main contractor at the operations of Compañía Minera Santa Bárbara.

With Andai's death in 1960 Philipp Brothers acquired a 90% ownership of Compañia Minera Santa Fe buying his stakes and those of Isbrandtsen but depletion of the mines and low international ore prices generated a crisis in the company, and it was then sold to Letay's Compañía Minera Santa Bárbara. Letay's Compañía Minera Santa Bárbara performed well despite being smaller than Compañia Minera Santa Fe as it was more efficient and mechanized, and importantly, Letay did not gave unskilled fellow Hungarians leadership positions as Andai did.

Emérico Letay was the uncle of Jorge Kemeny Letay whom he employed. Kemeny went on to be a mining businessman in his own right and owned Compañía Minera San Esteban Primera until his death in 2000. Under the ownership of Kemeny's son Marcelo Kemeny Füller the company and the mine it operated, San José, became known worldwide in 2010 for a mining accident that trapped 33 miners.

== Bibliography ==
- Danús, Hernán (2007). "IV. La minería del hierro y la industria siderúrgica". Crónicas mineras de medio siglo (1950-2000) (in Spanish). Santiago de Chile: RIL Editores. ISBN 978-956-284-555-7.
- Jancsó, Katalin (2018). "Húngaros en la industria minera de Chile". Encuentros Europa-Iberoamérica en un mundo globalizado (in Spanish). Budapest: Centro Iberoaméricano, Universidad de Pécs. ISBN 978-615-5848-04-9.
- Millán, Augusto (1996). Evaluación y factibilidad de proyectos mineros (in Spanish). Editorial Universitaria. ISBN 956-11-1241-8.
- Millán, Augusto (1999). Historia de la minería del hierro en Chile (in Spanish). Santiago de Chile: Editorial Universitaria. ISBN 956-11-1499-2.

== See also ==
- Hungarians in Chile
