= Quebrada La Totora Formation =

Cretaceous geologic formation in Chile

- Stratigraphic range: Albian-Turonian, ~105–88 Ma
- Type: Volcanic, volcaniclastic, and sedimentary unit
- Underlies: Viñita Formation
- Overlies: Quebrada Marquesa Formation
- Thickness: ~1,700 m (5,600 ft)

Lithology
- Primary: Conglomerate, sandstone, limestone
- Other: Andesite, dacite, rhyolite, tuff

Location
- Region: Coquimbo Region
- Country: Chile

Type section
- Named for: Quebrada (creek) La Totora
- Named by: Salazar et al. 2026

The Quebrada La Totora Formation (previously known as Quebrada La Totora Beds or Estratos Quebrada La Totora) is a volcanic, volcaniclastic, sedimentary, and fossiliferous geological formation that outcrops near Pichasca and Condoriaco of the Coquimbo Region, northern Chile. It is dated back to the latest Early Cretaceous and Late Cretaceous, about 105 to 88 million years ago (Albian-Turonian). The main lithology of the formation includes conglomerates, sandstones, and lacustrine limestones, with intercalations of andesitic to rhyolitic lavas, dacite, and tuffs. The Quebrada La Totora Formation preserves a rich fossil record of plants such as conifers, vertebrates, including dinosaurs (titanosaurs and abelisaurids), turtles, and crocodyliforms, and also freshwater molluscs including bivalves and gastropods.

The Viñita Formation, which overlays the Quebrada La Totora Formation, was described in 1965 by Luis Aguirre Le-Bert and Ernesto Egert Ruiz as a geological formation composed of three members, with Member 1 including conglomerate and sandstone, and Member 2 comprising limestone. Later in 1969 Rodolfo M. Casamiquela and team described vertebrate and plant fossil material from Pichasca (Natural Monument Pichasca), at Río Hurtado. They assigned the strata and fossils to the Viñita Formation, and also described units A to F from this site. Teresa Torres and Monica Rallo also described petrified wood in 1981 from the Pichasca site (units A, C, D, E of Casamiquela and team). Carlos Emparan and Germán Pineda in 1999 informally defined Estratos Quebrada La Totora from the type locality Quebrada La Totora of Condoriaco, at La Serena, where they reassigned the two previously described members 1 and 2 of the Viñita Formation to this new unit. However, their description of Estratos Quebrada La Totora lacked the formal status of a geological formation. This reassignation was followed by other authors and meant a redefinition of the Viñita Formation, which was characterized as a primarily volcanic and volcaniclastic unit with some sedimentary intercalations. Pineda and Emparan in 2006 reinterpreted the Pichasca site as belonging to Estratos Quebrada La Totora along with the fossil content and defined four distinct facies. Despite these reinterpretations and definitions, some authors continued to attribute the fossils from Pichasca to the Viñita Formation. In 2026 the unit was formally defined by Esteban Salazar and team, coining the term Quebrada La Totora Formation. As such, the known fossils from Pichasca are confined to the fossiliferous levels of the Quebrada La Totora Formation.

== Paleobiota of the Quebrada La Totora Formation ==
Color key: Taxon / Reclassified taxon / Taxon falsely reported as present / Dubious taxon or junior synonym / Ichnotaxon / Ootaxon / Morphotaxon	Notes; Uncertain or tentative taxa are in small text; ~~crossed out~~ taxa are discredited.

=== Amphibians ===
Genus	Species	Material	Locality	Unit	Notes	Images
Amphibia indet.	Indeterminate	Not specified.	Pichasca.		An amphibian.	

=== Crocodyliformes ===
Genus	Species	Material	Locality	Unit	Notes	Images
Crocodyliformes indet.	Indeterminate	Not specified.	Pichasca.	Facies (a).	A crocodyliform.	

=== Dinosaurs ===
Genus	Species	Material	Locality	Unit	Notes	Images
Dinosauria indet.	Indeterminate	Not specified.	Pichasca.	Facies (a).	A dinosaur.	

==== Sauropods ====
Genus	Species	Material	Locality	Unit	Notes	Images
Lithostrotia indet.	Indeterminate	Partial right humerus, scapulacorocoid, caudal vertebra, ribs, ischium, and metapod.	Pichasca.		A titanosaurid sauropod. The humerus was initially referred to Antarctosaurus wichmannianus, but this assignation is considered invalid.	
Sauropoda indet.	Indeterminate	Not specified.	Pichasca.	Facies (a).	A sauropod dinosaur.	
Titanosauria indet.	Indeterminate	Partial bone fragments.	Pichasca (La Cantera).		A titanosaur sauropod.	
Titanosauria indet.	Indeterminate	Partial bone fragments.	Pichasca (Sección Titanosaurio).		A titanosaur sauropod.	
Titanosauria indet.	Indeterminate	Partial bone fragments.	Pichasca (Sección Titanosaurio Auxiliar).		A titanosaur sauropod.	
Titanosauridae indet.	Indeterminate	Partial dorsal vertebra and teeth.	Pichasca.		A titanosaurid sauropod.	

==== Theropods ====
Genus	Species	Material	Locality	Unit	Notes	Images
Abelisauridae indet.	Indeterminate	Two teeth.	Pichasca.	Unit F.	An abelisaurid theropod. Material initially described as Coelurosauria indet., later as Theropoda indet., then as Abelisauridae? indet., and eventually concluded to represent as abelisaurid teeth.	
Theropoda indet.	Indeterminate	Tooth.	Pichasca (Sección Titanosaurio).		A theropod dinosaur.	

=== Fish ===
Genus	Species	Material	Locality	Unit	Notes	Images
Osteoglossiformes indet.	Indeterminate	Not specified.	Pichasca.		A fish.	

=== Molluscs ===
==== Bivalves ====
Genus	Species	Material	Locality	Unit	Notes	Images
Bivalvia indet.	Indeterminate	Not specified.	Pichasca		A bivalve.	
Bivalvia indet.	Indeterminate	Not specified.	Pichasca (El Alero)		A bivalve.	
Exogyra	Indeterminate	Not specified.	Pichasca or Samo Alto.	Facies (a): from "local limestones".	A gryphaeid bivalve.	
Ostrea	Indeterminate	Not specified.	Pichasca or Samo Alto.	Facies (a): from "local limestones".	An ostreid bivalve.	

==== Gastropods ====
Genus	Species	Material	Locality	Unit	Notes	Images
Gastropoda indet.	Indeterminate	Not specified.	Pichasca		A gastropod.	
Gastropoda indet.	Indeterminate	Not specified.	Pichasca (El Alero)		A gastropod.	

=== Plants ===
Genus	Species	Material	Locality	Unit	Notes	Images
Plantae indet.	Indeterminate	Leaf and roots remains.	Pichasca.	Unit B and E.	A plant.	
Plantae indet.	Indeterminate	Fossil trunks.	Pichasca (La Cantera).		A woody plant.	
Plantae indet.	Indeterminate	Fossil trunks.	Pichasca (Sección Titanosaurio).		A woody plant.	
Plantae indet.	Indeterminate	Fossil trunks.	Pichasca (Sección Titanosaurio Basal).		A woody plant.	

==== Angiosperms ====
Genus	Species	Material	Locality	Unit	Notes	Images
Elaeocarpoxylon	E. pichasquensis	Wood pieces.	Pichasca.		An elaeocarpacean. Initially described as E. pichasquensis, this species is considered invalid and lies outside the assigned family.	
Myrtoxylon	M. pichasquensis	Wood pieces.	Pichasca.		A myrtacean. Initially described as M. pichasquensis, this species is considered invalid.	
Nothofagoxylon	N. pichasquensis	Two irregular wood pieces.	Pichasca.		A nothofagacean. Initially described as N. pichasquensis, this species is now considered a synonym of N. menendezii.	

==== Gymnosperms ====
Genus	Species	Material	Locality	Unit	Notes	Images
Araucarioxylon	A. pichasquensis	Two irregular wood pieces.	Pichasca.		An araucariacean. Because of generic synonymy it has been reclassified as Agathoxylon (Araucarioxylon) pichasquensis.	
Coniferales indet.	Indeterminate	Not specified.	Pichasca.	Facies (a).	A conifer.	
Coniferales indet.	Indeterminate	Not specified.	Near Cerro Buitre or Majada.	Facies (a).	A conifer.	

=== Turtles ===
Genus	Species	Material	Locality	Unit	Notes	Images
Chelonii indet.	Indeterminate	Not specified.	Pichasca.	Facies (a).	A turtle.	
Testudinata indet.	Indeterminate	Not specified.	Pichasca (El Alero).		A turtle.	
Testudines indet.	Indeterminate	Shell fragments.	Pichasca.		A turtle.	

== See also ==
- Arqueros Formation
- Quebrada Marquesa Formation
- Las Chilcas Formation
