= Leonardo Farkas =

Chilean businessman and philanthropist

- Farkas in 2015
- Born: Leonardo Julio Farkas Klein; March 20, 1967 (age 59); Vallenar, Chile
- Education: University of Santiago, Chile
- Father: Daniel Farkas

Leonardo Julio Farkas Klein (born March 20, 1967) is a Chilean businessman and philanthropist of Hungarian-Jewish descent, his wealth comes from iron mining companies operating in Chile. His philanthropy includes involvement in the Chilean Telethon, and people affected by disasters or in a vulnerable situation.

== Early years ==
Farkas's parents were Hungarian Jews who emigrated from Transylvania to South America in 1939. His father, Daniel Farkas was one of various Hungarians in Chile active in iron mining in southern Atacama Region, in a geological region known as the Chilean Iron Belt. He was one of the businessmen that remained independent at a time when fellow Hungarian Andrés Andai rapidly expanded his mining operations in the 1950s. Daniel Farkas worked at the Compañía Minera Santa Bárbara, a company led by Andai's rival Emérico Letay, where the brothers of his wife, Francisco and José Klein had each a 30% stake. Over time he also developed his own mining businesses and owned among other things a glass bottle factory.

Daniel Farkas lost much of his wealth with the nationalization of mines in Brazil in the 1950s and with the Allende administration's nationalization of iron mining in 1971.

Leonardo Farkas studied business administration at the University of Santiago, Chile.

== Musical career ==
In the 1980s, he emigrated to the United States and worked in show business as a piano player while traveling between Las Vegas, New York, and Miami. He also worked in several Caribbean cruising companies. Known as "The Orchestra Man", he shared stages with artists such as Tom Jones and Julio Iglesias.

During his performances, he met his wife, an American, Betina Friedman Parker, the great-granddaughter of Arthur Winarick, founder of the Concord Hotel in the Catskills in the state of New York, where they got married.

At the age of 35, he retired from music to focus solely on his wife and their three children, taking on various jobs as an exporter and seller of various products. He also entered the real estate business in the United States, and then mining business in Chile.

== Return to Chile and mining businesses ==
Farkas returned to Chile in 2004 following the death of his father and reactivated the mining companies Compañía Minera Santa Bárbara and Compañía Minera Santa Fe that had been dormant for years. In doing so he sought a capital injection from the Australian company Admiralty Resources and oriented exports towards China. In 2009 he sold Compañía Minera Santa Bárbara to his Australian partners and kept Compañía Minera Santa Fe which remains the largest iron mining company in Chile after Compañía Minera del Pacífico. Farkas reportedly relocated from Chile to New York in 2012 shortly before the end of the 2000s commodities boom.

In 2021, the international news company Bloomberg chose Leonardo Farkas among the 500 most influential Latin Americans. The agency stated that the mining entrepreneur is retired but "remains a relevant figure in local business and politics. More than anything, a philanthropist, Farkas has become a success story that, through social networks, promotes a successful platform to help thousands of Chileans in poverty situations."

By 2021 Farkas had either sold or lost ownership of his mining companies to his Indian and Australian partners but all the mines of his former companies were closed or paralyzed by 2021.

=== Involvement in Chilean politics ===
In October 2008 Farkas announced that he was considering being an independent candidate for the presidential election of 2009. However, on December 5, he announced he would not be running.

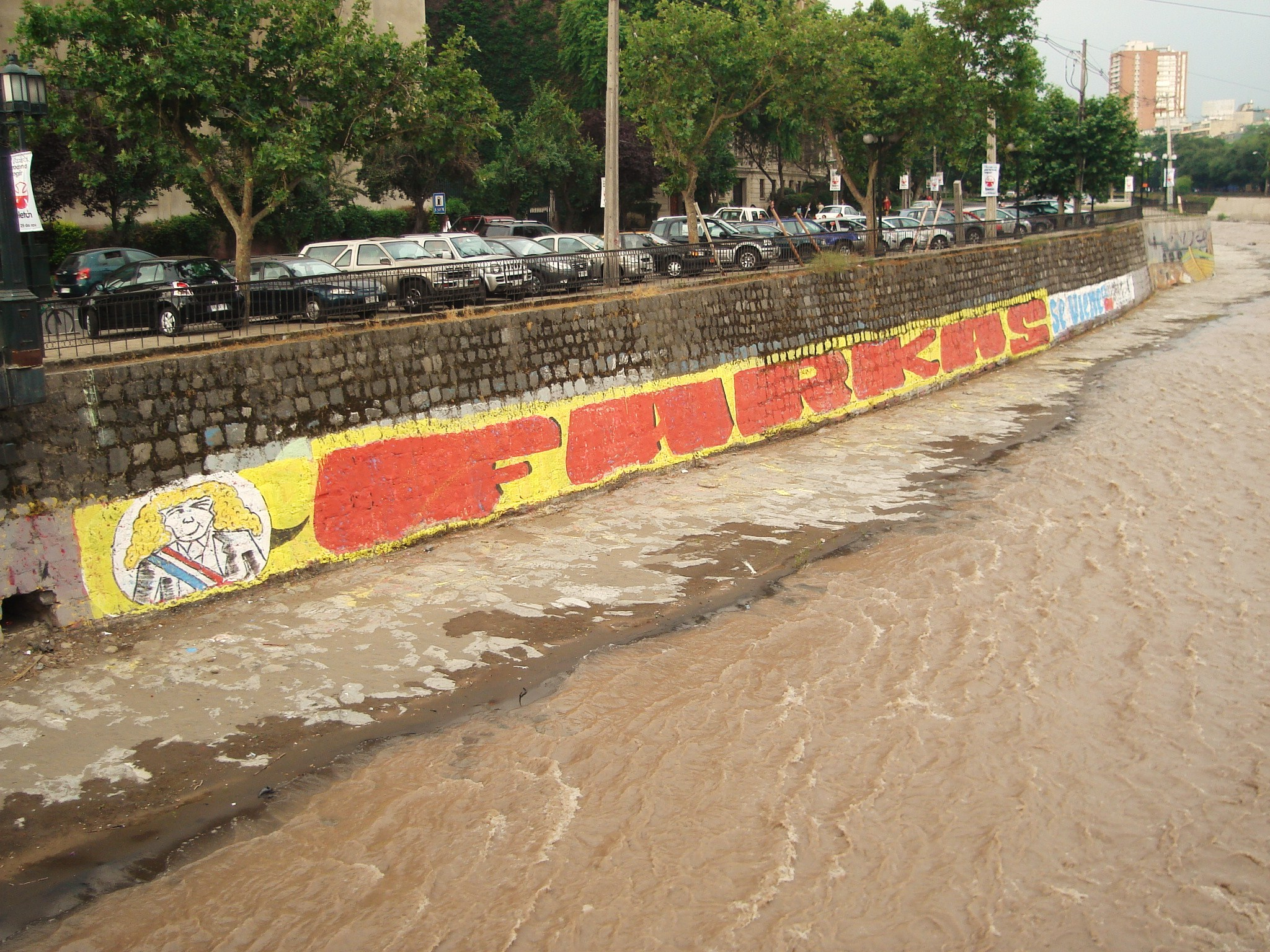
Mural alluding to a possible presidential candidacy of Farkas, along the Mapocho River, Santiago, 2008.

In the polls of the presidential elections of 2009, 2013 and 2017 in Chile, he has been mentioned among the top preferences but has never accepted to run. Between 2019 and 2020, Farkas's preferences increased in the polls. In July 2020, Farkas polled in second place for Chilean presidency.

== Philanthropy and Jewish remembrance and education ==
Farkas appears in the Teletón (Chilean telethon), a fundraising campaign for handicapped children. Farkas donated hundreds of millions of pesos, and in 2008, donated 1 billion pesos (approx. US$2 million), becoming the first individual to donate such amount of money to this campaign. Farkas has been very critical of the Chilean upper class, stating that "they're usually very stingy and elitist" and don't do enough to mitigate Chile's social problems. He has also said that if elected president "all Chileans would have their own house". This rhetoric of appealing to the masses of poor people has gained him substantial support among that social group and some harsh criticism from his business peers and local politicians, often labeling him as a "populist" in search of some spotlight.

During the rescue operation in Copiapó, Chile of the trapped miners, Farkas donated $10,000 to each of the 33 rescued men. Farkas reportedly gave checks in the miners' names to each of the families and set up a separate fund to collect donations. On July 1, 2011, Farkas was given an award by the Viña del Mar Mayor for his contributions to the city.

On February 7, 2018, Farkas offered a reward of 10 million Chilean pesos for anyone who found Emmelyn Catalina Cañales Vidal, an 11-year-old girl who was kidnapped in Licantén, Chile.

Farkas is a patron of the March of the Living, an annual educational program which brings students to Poland, to study the history of the Holocaust and examine the roots of prejudice, intolerance and hate.

According to a study, coordinated by Magdalena Aninat, director of the Centro de Filantropía e Inversiones Sociales (Cefis) of the Universidad Adolfo Ibáñez (UAI), which investigated the philanthropy and social investments of Chilean companies, concluded that "Farkas operates as a catalyst, pushing others to action while bringing a necessary sense of conscience to the issue." He has a very interesting role in making visible a more American model of the success of the business world, where that success closes with giving back to society. In Chile we are not used to making donations visible, but Farkas is constantly challenging the business world to be present and that is positive," said the UAI academic.

=== Involvement with March Of The Living ===
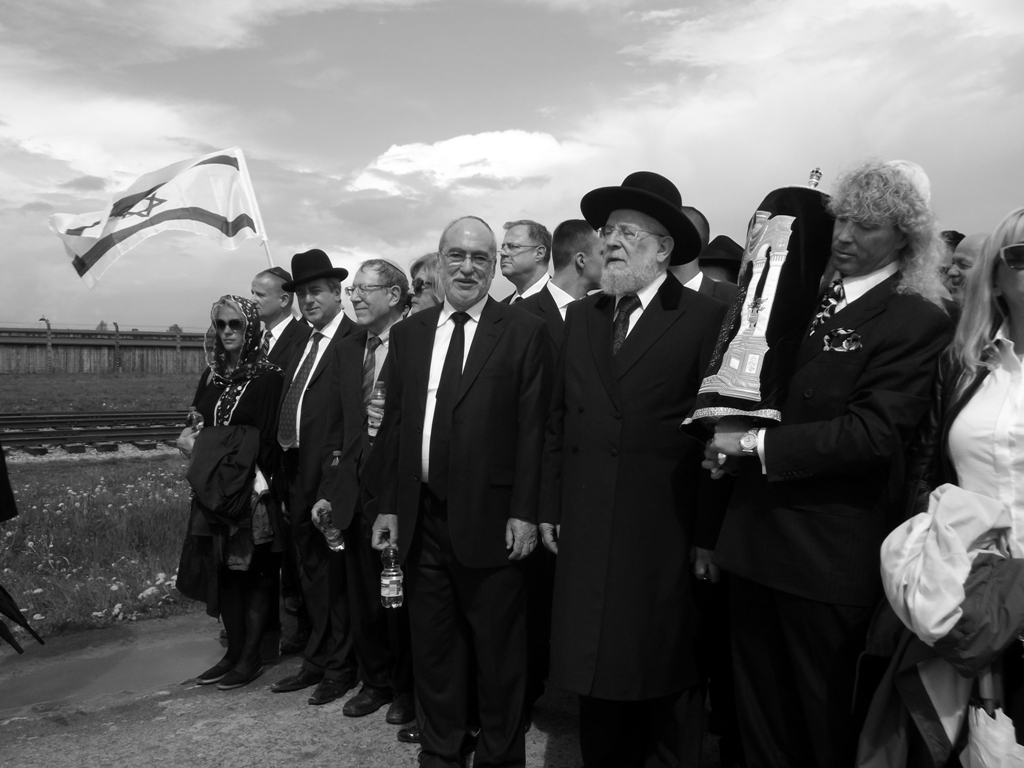
Farkas at the March of the Living in Oświęcim, 2014.

In 2014, with the support of Leonardo Farkas, March of the Living marked the 70th anniversary of the destruction of Hungarian Jewry at the hands of the Nazis in 1944 during World War II. On Holocaust Remembrance Day, at the close of the memorial ceremony on the grounds of Auschwitz-Birkenau, a number of Holocaust survivors – many whose relatives perished in the death camp – joined Leonardo Farkas in the writing of the last letters of a Torah. The Torah was donated to the March of the Living by Mr. Farkas.

=== Cultural donations ===
In 2014, Leonardo donated the seven newly written Sefer Torah sent to six different continents: Africa, Asia, Australia, Europe, North America and South America. Over the years, Farkas has donated Sefer Torahs to the Chabad-Lubavitch hassidic Jewish organization and other institutions around the world.
