= Cerro Negro Norte mine =

Iron mine in Chile

Cerro Negro Norte
- Location within Atacama Region Location within Chile

Location
- Location: Atacama Region, Chile; 27°06′20″S 70°20′43″W

Production
- Products: Iron ore concentrate

History
- Opened: 2010–2014

Owner
- Company: Compañía Minera del Pacífico
- Acquired: 1971

Cerro Negro Norte (CNN) is an open-pit iron mine in northern Chile about 30 km north of the city of Copiapó in inland Atacama Region. The ore of the mine is one of various iron oxide-apatite (IOA) ores that are part of the north–south Chilean Iron Belt.

== History ==
Cerro Negro Norte was originally mined in the 1960s by Compañía Minera Santa Fe. As part of the Allende administration's Chilean nationalization of iron the inactive of Cerro Negro Norte became state-owned in 1971 when the government expired all mining concessions of iron ore deposits that were not being mined.

Cerro Negro Norte opened again in 2010–2014 and in 2021 it had a production capacity of 4 million tons of iron. It produces iron ore concentrate that is transported as pulp in pipelines to the port of Punta Totoralillo located 55 km northwest of the mine. The mine stores and processes iron ore from smaller mining companies.

In 2014, plans for a desalination plant to provide water for mining operations at it and other mines was announced.

As of 2025 Cerro Negro Norte was the newest of the mines owned and operated by Compañía Minera del Pacífico (CMP). In early 2025 Compañía Minera del Pacífico submitted a plan to the Environmental Assessment Service to increase iron production capacity at the mine from 4 to 4.5 million metric tons. Among other things the project seeks to improve are the conminution and concentrating plants.
