= Hungarians in Chile =

Hungarians in Chile Húngaros en Chile Magyarok Chilében
- (Chile) (Hungary)

Total population
- 2,000

Regions with significant populations
- Punta Arenas, Santiago, La Serena, Viña del Mar

Languages
- Spanish (Chilean Spanish), Hungarian

Religion
- Christianity (mostly Roman Catholic and Protestant), Judaism

Related ethnic groups
- Hungarian people, Hungarian diaspora, Hungarian Argentines, Hungarian Brazilians, Hungarian Canadians, Hungarian Mexicans, Hungarian Americans, Hungarian Uruguayans, Hungarian Venezuelans, Chilean people of European descent

Hungarians in Chile (Hungarian: Magyarok Chilében, Spanish: Húngaros en Chile) include immigrants from Hungary to Chile and their descendants. In South America, more Hungarians settled in Brazil. However, Chile was a major point of passage for Hungarians to North America (the United States) and Australia. Most Hungarian immigrants to Australia from South America during the first half of the 20th century came via Chile. There is no clear record of the number of people of Hungarian descent living in the country.

Hungarian Chileans are known for their contributions to the development of iron mining in northern Chile since the 1950s.

== Notable people ==
Hungarian immigrants to Chile

- Andrés Andai - iron mining businessman
- Daniel Farkas - iron mining businessman, Hungarian-Jewish
- András Gergely - ice hockey player (born in Budapest)
- Máximo Garay - soccer manager (born in Budapest)
- Emérico Letay - lawyer and iron mining businessman
- Juan Schwanner - soccer player and soccer manager (born in Szombathely)

Chileans of Hungarian descent

- Carlos Caszely - former soccer player
- Leonardo Julio Farkas Klein - iron mining businessman, Hungarian-Jewish parents
- Salvador Litvak - Chilean-born American filmmaker and social media influencer
- Antonio Hartmann - former professional tennis player, Hungarian father
- Nicolás Massú - professional tennis player, Hungarian-Jewish parents
- Antonio Horvath - politician and senator
- Alejandro Pakozdi - former professional tennis player, Hungarian father
- Mathías Leonardo Vidangossy Rebolledo - professional soccer player
- Eyal Meyer, actor and Kalaripayattu instructor

== See also ==
- Chile-Hungary relations
- Hungarian people
- Hungarian diaspora
