= Compañía Minera Santa Bárbara =

Chilean mining company

Vallenar Iron Company
- Formerly: Compañia Minera Santa Bárbara
- Type: Private
- Industry: Mining
- Founded: 1952
- Founder: Emérico Letay; José Klein; Francisco Klein
- Headquarters: Santiago, Chile
- Key people: Leonardo Farkas
- Products: Iron ore

Compañia Minera Santa Bárbara is a Chilean mining company. The company remained dormant from 1977 to 2005 when its heir Leonardo Farkas activated it in view of good international iron ore prices. In doing so Farkas sought a capital injection from the Australian company Admiralty Resources and oriented exports towards China. The company made an ore sales agreement of US$45 million per year with Commercial Metals Company in 2005. Farkas controlled the company by owning 51% of it until 2008 when he sold about 10% to Admiralty Resources which then came to own 60% of it. The company rebranded in early 2009 to Vallenar Iron Company. In late 2010 Admiralty Resources sold the company to Australis Mining, and by 2015 it had been twice put on auction but declared failure to award.

== History up to 1977 ==
It was established in 1952 by the Hungarian immigrants to Chile Emérico Letay and the brothers Francisco and José Klein. The brothers each owned 30% and Letay 40% of the company. The ores of Huantemé, which the company paid a fee to exploit, was its first mine. Soon however they entered into conflict with Andrés Andai's Compañía Minera Santa Fe that was expanding at many locations across northern Chile from 1954 to 1959. In 1957 Letay secured an agreement with Andai in which Compañía Minera Santa Bárbara would keep mines and ore deposits in the Huasco River basin and Sante Fe would keep the rest of the country. Metalmine, a company of Letay's nephew Jorge Kemeny Letay, (Note: Kemeny was a mechanical engineer who first established the company Metalmine and later Compañía Minera San Esteban that ran the mine of San José near Copiapó. This mine, then under ownership of one of Kemeny's sons, became known worldwide for an accident in 2010 in which 33 miners were trapped.) was the main contractor at the operations of Compañía Minera Santa Bárbara. Another nephew of Letay, Roberto Kemeny Letay, who was a mining engineer, was named superintendent of the company. Compañía Minera Santa Barbára performed well despite being smaller than Compañia Minera Santa Fe as it was more efficient and mechanized, and importantly, Letay did not gave fellow unskilled Hungarians leadership positions as his rival Andai did. In a bid to raise capital to expand the company World Commerce Corporation was made owner of 50% of the company after injecting capital. In 1964 the company formed the joint venture Compañía Minera San Andrés with Compañía Minera Santa Fe in which the latter owned 60% of the stakes and Compañia Minera Santa Bárbara owned 40%. This joint venture mined the deposits of Cerro Imán. In 1967, seven years after Andai's death, Compañía Minera Santa Bárbara bought Compañía Minera Santa Fe and Roberto Kemeny was installed as its general manager. In 1971 the Allende administration nationalized Compañía Minera Santa Bárbara and Compañia Minera Santa Fe and made them part of CAP S.A..

== Bibliography ==
- Danús, Hernán (2007). "IV. La minería del hierro y la industria siderúrgica". Crónicas mineras de medio siglo (1950-2000) (in Spanish). Santiago de Chile: RIL Editores. ISBN 978-956-284-555-7.
- Jancsó, Katalin (2018). "Húngaros en la industria minera de Chile". Encuentros Europa-Iberoamérica en un mundo globalizado (in Spanish). Budapest: Centro Iberoaméricano, Universidad de Pécs. ISBN 978-615-5848-04-9.
- Millán, Augusto (1999). Historia de la minería del hierro en Chile (in Spanish). Santiago de Chile: Editorial Universitaria. ISBN 956-11-1499-2.
