= Corral Quemado mine =

Manganese mine in Coquimbo Region, Chile

Corral Quemado
- Location within Coquimbo Region Location within Chile
- Location: Coquimbo Region, Chile; 30°14′51″S 70°56′45″W
- Products: Manganese
- Closed: 2009

Corral Quemado is a closed manganese mine in Coquimbo Region, in north-central Chile. It was last active in 2009 when the company Manganesos Atacama ceased operations and manganese mining in Chile ended. The mine was particularly active in the 1940s when it was notorious for its poor labour conditions including child labour. Work conditions in the mines denounced by members of the National Congress of Chile in 1943 and 1944. Manganese ore in the mine appears in the form of near-horizontal sheets of a thickness ranging from one to two meters. Some mine workers developed a disease known as locura mangánica (lit. "manganic madness") due to exposure to manganse.

== See also ==
- Arqueros Formation, manganese-bearing formation in Coquimbo Region
- Quebrada Marquesa Formation, manganese-bearing formation in Coquimbo Region

== Bibliography ==
- Townley, Brian; Díaz, Alejandro; Luca, Rodrigo (2017). Estado del arte y potenciales recursos Co y Mn en Chile (Report). Advanced Mining Technology Center.
