= Huachipato, Chile =

Huachipato
- district (neighbourhood)
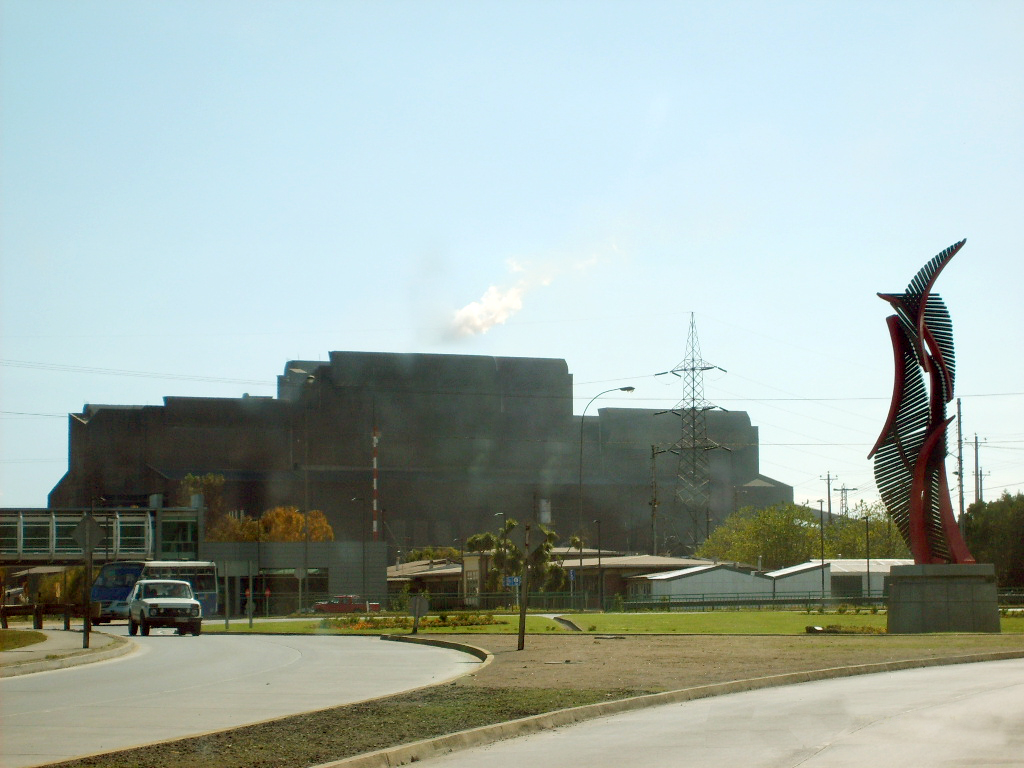
- Main entrance to Siderúrgica Huachipato

- Location in Chile
- Coordinates (city): 36°44′53″S 073°05′55″W
- Country: Chile
- Region: Biobío
- Province: Concepción
- Commune: Talcahuano

Area
  - Total: 13.2 km^{2} (5.1 sq mi)
- Elevation: 1 m (3.3 ft)

Population (2002 Census)
  - Total: 9,665
  - Density: 732/km^{2} (1,900/sq mi)
- Time zone: UTC−4 (CLT)
  - Summer (DST): UTC−3 (CLST)
- Area code: 56 + 41

Huachipato is census district and neighbourhood in Talcahuano Commune, part of the conurbation of Greater Concepción in the Biobío Region of southern Chile. It is the industrialized part of the commune supporting a steel mill and oil refinery.

== Etymology ==
The word huachipato is a Mapuche word meaning "a trap to catch birds". It may be the result of a mixture of Spanish and Mapuche, where the local name for a snare is huache or huachi.

== Demographics ==
The district is completely urban and had a population of 9,665 as of the 2002 census with 2,415 housing units.

== History ==
Because of the high cost of pig iron from the aging steel mill in Corral, the Chilean Development Corporation (CORFO) decided to support building a new steel mill in Huachipato. Compañía de Acero del Pacífico was formed and began construction in 1947. The mill now named "Siderúrgica Huachipato" was completed in 1950. From the 1960s to the 1990s the mine of El Romeral provided most of the iron to the mill.

The same year that construction of the steel mill started, a football club, Club Deportivo Huachipato, was founded. As their initial fans were employees of the local steel company, they adopted the nickname Acereros ("Steelers").

In 1966 Empresa Nacional del Petróleo (ENAP) opened an oil refinery in Huachipato.

The steel mill the town grew around was shut down on October 22, 2024, largely due to the inability to compete with cheaper Chinese steel prices and growing financial losses.
