= La Liga Formation =

Geologic formation in Chile

- Stratigraphic range: Late Jurassic–Neocomian
- Type: Geologic formation
- Unit of: Agua Salada Subvolcanic Complex

Lithology
- Primary: Andesite

Location
- Coordinates: 29°43′19″S 71°14′9″W
- Region: Coquimbo Region
- Country: Chile
- La Liga Formation (Chile)

La Liga Formation (Spanish: Formación La Liga) is a geologic formation Late Jurassic and Early Cretaceous age cropping out in Coquimbo Region, Chile. Rocks of the formation are andesites. Locally the rocks of the formation present epidote alteration. The iron ores of El Romeral mine are emplaced on La Liga Formation.
