= Viñita Formation =

Geologic formation in Chile

- Stratigraphic range: Santonian-Campanian, ~84–78 Ma
- Type: Geological formation

Lithology
- Primary: Andesite, basalt, tuff
- Other: Conglomerate

Location
- Region: Coquimbo Region
- Country: Chile

The Viñita Formation is a primarily volcanic and volcaniclastic geological formation with some sedimentary intercalations in Coquimbo, Chile, whose strata date back to the Late Cretaceous about 84 and 78 million years ago (Santonian to Campanian).

== See also ==
- Quebrada La Totora Formation
