= El Romeral mine =

Iron mine in Chile

El Romeral
- Location within Coquimbo Region Location within Chile
- Location: Coquimbo Region, Chile; 29°43′19″S 71°14′9″W
- Products: Iron
- Company: Compañía Minera del Pacífico
- Acquired: 1971

El Romeral is an iron mine in north-central Chile. The mine benefits from being located only 22 km NNE of the city of La Serena and being next to Guayacán, a port with conditions for high-tonnage cargo ships. The mine emerged as a replacement for the nearby mine of El Tofo that was close to depletion in the early 1950s. El Romeral was Bethlehem Chile Iron Mines last major investment as Compañía de Acero del Pacífico obtained the ownership of El Tofo and El Romeral in the early 1971 when they were nationalized during the Presidency of Salvador Allende. Despite being initially an expensive mine in terms of infrastructure investment and having a troublesome geology El Romeral proved with time to host more iron than initially thought. Following an ownership restructuring Compañía Minera del Pacífico, now holds control of the mine. During the 1970s El Romeral would produce enough iron to fully supply the steel mill of Huachipato. From the 1970s onward El Romeral came to overshadow El Algarrobo mine in iron production.

The ore of the mine is one of various iron oxide-apatite (IOA) ores located in the southern end of the Chilean Iron Belt. As with other ores of the Chilean Iron Belt located south of Chañaral, El Romeral is located on the Atacama Fault. El Romeral in particular is located on a southern extension of Atacama Fault known as El Romeral Fault Zone (Spanish: Zona de Falla El Romeral). The ores of the mine are emplaced within andesite rocks of La Liga Formation.

== Bibliography ==
- Millán, Augusto (1999). Historia de la minería del hierro en Chile (in Spanish). Santiago de Chile: Editorial Universitaria. ISBN 956-11-1499-2.
- Rojas Martínez, Paula Amanda (2017-06-07). Genesis of the El Romeral Iron Ore: New contributions to the understanding of iron oxide apatite deposits (MSc thesis). Santiago de Chile: University of Chile.
