= Chañaral =

- City and commune
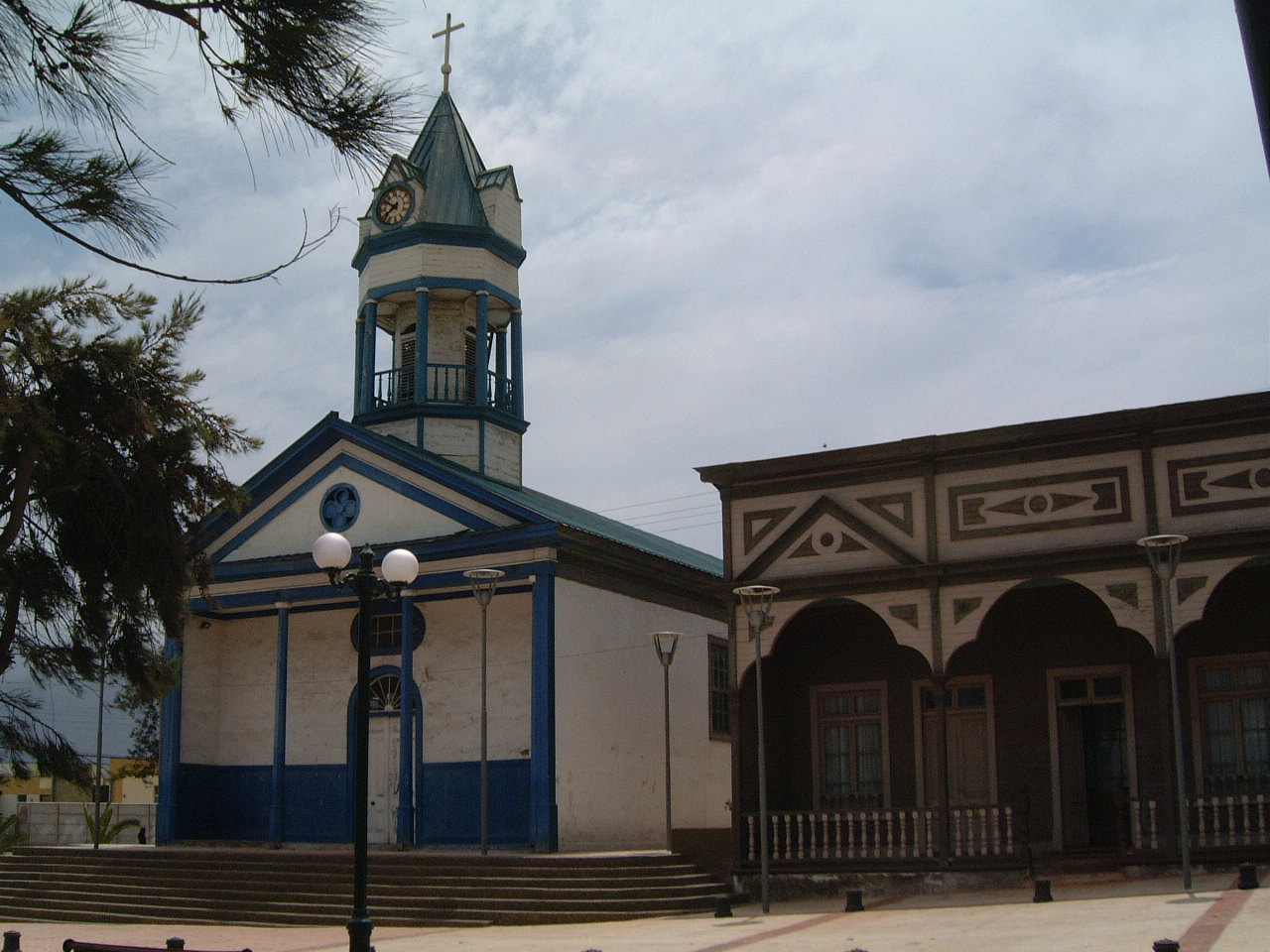
- Plaza Chañaral

- Coat of arms Location of Chañaral in Atacama Region Location in Chile
- Coordinates: 26°20′40″S 70°37′19″W
- Country: Chile
- Region: Atacama
- Province: Chañaral Province

Government
  - Type: Municipality
  - Alcalde: Margarita Flores (PR)

Area
  - Total: 5,772.4 km^{2} (2,228.7 sq mi)
- Elevation: 198 m (650 ft)

Population (2002 Census)
  - Total: 13,143
  - Density: 2.2769/km^{2} (5.8971/sq mi)
  - Urban: 13,180
  - Rural: 363

Sex
  - Men: 6,968
  - Women: 6,575
- Time zone: UTC−4 (CLT)
  - Summer (DST): UTC−3 (CLST)
- Area code: 56 + 52
- Climate: BWh
- Website: www.munichanaral.cl

Chañaral is a small coastal city and commune in the Atacama Region, Chile and capital of the Chañaral Province. The ocean is contaminated by the copper mining activity in the area. Just north of the city lies Pan de Azúcar National Park.

It is the central town of a mining district dominated by medium-scale mining, including the nearby El Carmen mine which is considered the basis for the medium-scale iron mining in Chile.

== History ==
In 1824, Diego de Almeyda discovered significant copper deposits near Chañaral, and copper mining began in the area. The town was founded in October 26, 1833 as Chañaral de las Ánimas ("Chañar field of the Souls").

== Demographics ==
According to the 2002 census by the National Statistics Institute (INE), the commune of Chañaral spans an area of 5,772.4 km^{2} (2,229 sq mi) and had 13,543 inhabitants (6,968 men and 6,575 women). Of these, 13,180 (97.3%) lived in urban areas and 363 (2.7%) in rural areas. The population fell by 2.8% (393 persons) between the 1992 and 2002 censuses.

The demonym for a person from Chañaral is Chañaralino for a man and Chañaralina for a woman.

== Administration ==
As a commune, Chañaral is a third-level administrative division of Chile administered by a municipal council, headed by an alcalde (mayor) who is directly elected every four years. Since June 2021 the alcalde is Margarita Flores Salazar (PR).

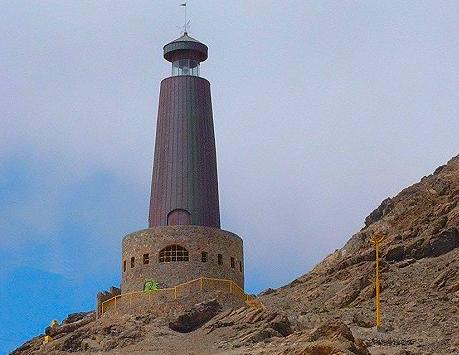
Faro del Milenio lighthouse in Chañaral

== Climate ==
Climate data for Chañaral
| Month | Jan | Feb | Mar | Apr | May | Jun | Jul | Aug | Sep | Oct | Nov | Dec | Year |
|---|---|---|---|---|---|---|---|---|---|---|---|---|---|
| Mean daily maximum °C (°F) | 22.9 (73.2) | 23.2 (73.8) | 22.5 (72.5) | 20.3 (68.5) | 18.4 (65.1) | 16.3 (61.3) | 16.3 (61.3) | 16.4 (61.5) | 16.7 (62.1) | 18.1 (64.6) | 19.5 (67.1) | 21.3 (70.3) | 19.3 (66.8) |
| Mean daily minimum °C (°F) | 15.6 (60.1) | 16.2 (61.2) | 14.8 (58.6) | 12.9 (55.2) | 9.7 (49.5) | 8.8 (47.8) | 8.8 (47.8) | 9.4 (48.9) | 10.2 (50.4) | 11.4 (52.5) | 13.1 (55.6) | 15.1 (59.2) | 12.2 (53.9) |
| Average precipitation mm (inches) | 0.0 (0.0) | 0.0 (0.0) | 0.0 (0.0) | 0.0 (0.0) | 0.0 (0.0) | 0.0 (0.0) | 1.1 (0.04) | 0.0 (0.0) | 0.0 (0.0) | 0.6 (0.02) | 0.0 (0.0) | 0.0 (0.0) | 1.7 (0.06) |
| Average relative humidity (%) | 64 | 64 | 68 | 71 | 75 | 75 | 75 | 76 | 72 | 70 | 67 | 66 | 70 |
Source: Bioclimatografia de Chile
