= Chilean Copper Commission =

Independent mining policy advisory body in Chile

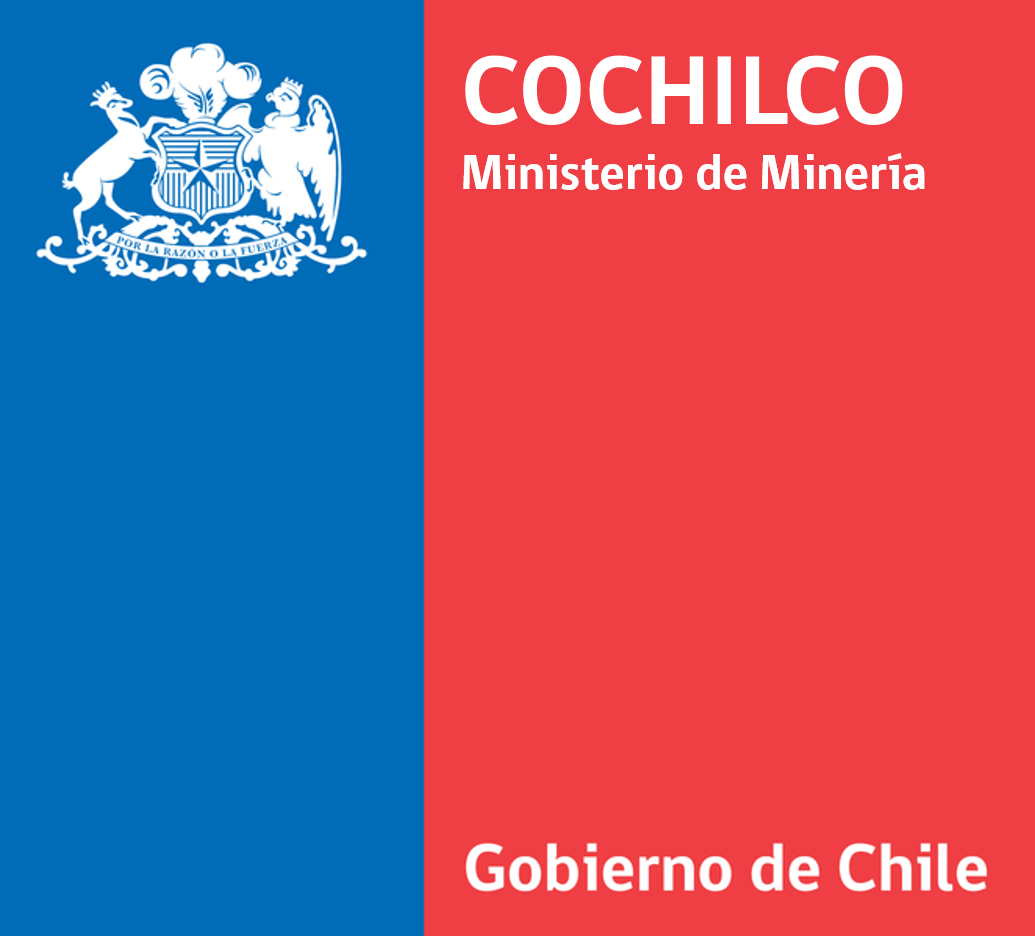
Logotype of the Chilean Copper Commission.

The Chilean Copper Commission (Spanish: Comisión Chilena del Cobre) or COCHILCO is a technical agency aimed to provide advice to the Chilean government on issues related to copper, a metal of which Chile is the worlds largest producer, and mining in general. It is one of Chile's mining-sector state entities, together with National Mining Enterprise (ENAMI) and the National Geology and Mining Service (SERNAGEOMIN). It was established in 1976.

Each year, COCHILCO publishes a report titled Inversión en la Minería Chilena (Investment in Chilean Mining), a portfolio of mining projects with a rolling ten-year forecast. COCHILCO is together with the National Customs Service and the Internal Taxes Service (SII) one of the state entities that participate in the mining traceability programme of the Ministry of Finance.

The agency is decentralized and governed by a council of seven persons of that includes the Minister of Mining, the Minister of National Defense, the chief of the general staff of the Armed Forces, two persons assigned by the Central Bank of Chile and two representants named by the President of Chile, of which one has to be a mining engineer.
