= Cerro Imán =

Iron mine in Chile

- Location within Atacama Region Location within Chile

Location
- Location: Atacama Region, Chile; 27°15′59″S 70°25′04″W

Production
- Products: Iron

History
- Closed: 1980

Owner
- Company: Sociedad Minera Reconquista

Cerro Imán (lit. "Magnet Hill") is an iron mine in northern Chile about 15 km northwest of the city of Copiapó. The ore of the mine is one of various iron oxide-apatite (IOA) ores that are part of the north-south Chilean Iron Belt. It lies about 1 km west of a smaller iron mine known as Fortuna.

While owned by Sociedad Minera Reconquista it was Compañía Minera Santa Fe which in return for a fee exploited the mine for many years. The mine was the last iron mine to close during the decline of iron mining in Chile in the 1970s, doing so in 1980. The mine was later acquired in 1964 by Compañía Minera San Andrés which was joint venture of Compañía Minera Santa Fe (60%) and Compañía Minera Santa Bárbara (40%). Its ores were exported from the port of Caldera and the first shipment took off in 1958.

Starting in 2025 a 50%-50% joint venture of Andes Iron and Minería Activa (Andes Iron owns 22% of Minería Activa) seeks to explore for more mineral in the mine. The sale of Cerro Imán to these companies in 2011 involved a case of conflict of interest for President Sebastián Piñera whose family owned stakes in Andes Iron and for the seller Arnaldo Del Campo Arias who became member of the board of state-owned ENAMI a few months prior to his sale of Cerro Imán.

Cerro Imán has a pit lake where groundwater levels have been observed to decline in the early 2020s.

== Geology ==
The iron ores at Cerro Imán have ore grades of 62% iron, low phosphorus content and high contents of sulphur and once mined they were therefore usually mixed with iron ores from other mines to dilute its high sulphur content. In terms of minerals the ores are chiefly made of magnetite with apatite and actinolite as gangue minerals. In some places the magnetite has been oxidized into hematite. The orebody bounds to the west with a NNE-trending geological fault beyond of which there are mylonitized rocks. To the east of the mine geology is made up of andesitic rocks that are locally brecciated and altered with actinolite.

== Bibliography ==
- Danús, Hernán (2007). "IV. La minería del hierro y la industria siderúrgica". Crónicas mineras de medio siglo (1950-2000) (in Spanish). Santiago de Chile: RIL Editores. ISBN 978-956-284-555-7.
- Jancsó, Katalin (2018). "Húngaros en la industria minera de Chile". Encuentros Europa-Iberoamérica en un mundo globalizado (in Spanish). Budapest: Centro Iberoaméricano, Universidad de Pécs. ISBN 978-615-5848-04-9.
- Millán, Augusto (1999). Historia de la minería del hierro en Chile (in Spanish). Santiago de Chile: Editorial Universitaria. ISBN 956-11-1499-2.
