= Quebrada Marquesa Formation =

Geological formation in northern Chile

- Stratigraphic range: Barremian-Albian
- Type: Geological formation
- Overlies: Arqueros Formation
- Thickness: 1500 m

Lithology
- Primary: Porphyritic andesite, tuff, limestone, volcanic sandstone, calcareous sandstone
- Other: Conglomerate, manganese deposits

Location
- Coordinates: 24°1′51.70″S 68°11′44.79″W
- Region: Coquimbo Region
- Country: Chile
- Quebrada Marquesa Formation (Chile)

Quebrada Marquesa Formation (Spanish: Formación Quebrada Marquesa) is a geological formation composed of alternations of volcanic and volcaniclastic rock layers and mostly continental (as opposed to marine) sedimanry rocks in inland Coquimbo Region, northern Chile. Its does however have a few layers of marine sedimentary rock near its base. It overlies the older Arqueros Formation wth which it has some interdigitation. Quebrada Marquesa Formation contains economically valuable manganese layers in its upper half. The formation has a stratigraphic thickness of about 1500 m.
