= Compañía Minera Santa Fe =

Chilean mining company

- Formerly: Compañía Minera Santa Fe
- Type: Private
- Industry: Mining
- Founded: 1952
- Founder: Andrés Andai
- Headquarters: Santiago, Chile
- Key people: Leonardo Farkas; Emérico Letay; Roberto Kemeny; Leslie Geiger
- Products: Iron ore
- Subsidiaries: Compañia Minera Carmen

Compañia Minera Santa Fe is a Chilean mining company. The company remained dormant from 1977 to 2005 when its heir Leonardo Farkas activated it in view of good international iron ore prices. In doing so Farkas sought new business partners and oriented exports towards China. In May 2009 Compañía Minera Santa Fe was approved for the processing of waste rock dumps at the Adrianitas mine. The company has also been involved in brownfield mineral exploration in El Carmen in the early 2010s.

Under Leonardo Farkas the company formed the joint venture Santa Fe Mining with JSW Steel. JSW Steel held 70% of the shares of the joint venture and Compañía Minera Santa Fe the remaining 30%.

Santa Fe Mining became part of the Santa Fe Holding which by 2021 was owned by JSW Steel but had by then no active mining operations. Of the eight mines operated by Santa Fe one Bellavista was considered profitable by 2022, but this mine was paralyzed by the COVID-19 pandemic in Chile in 2021 and its lease by the company was prematurely ended. In 2022 Diego Calvo SpA bought JSW Steel's 70% stake at Santa Fe Mining.

== History up to 1971 ==
The company was established in 1952 by the Hungarian immigrant to Chile Andrés Andai soon after he began mining iron ore at El Dorado mine near Ovalle. Under Andai's leadership the company expanded rapidly across northern Chile from 1954 to 1959 and soon it entered into conflict with Emérico Letay's Compañía Minera Santa Bárbara. In 1957 Letay secured an agreement with Andai in which Compañía Minera Santa Bárbara would keep mines and ore deposits in the Huasco River basin and Sante Fe would keep the rest of the country. In 1964 the company formed the joint venture Compañía Minera San Andrés with Compañía Minera Santa Bárbara in which the latter owned 40% of the stakes and Compañia Minera Santa Fe owned 60%. This joint venture mined the deposits of Cerro Imán. In 1967, seven years after Andai's death, Compañia Minera Santa Bárbara bought Compañia Minera Santa Fe and Roberto Kemeny was installed as its general manager. In 1971 the Allende administration nationalized Compañía Minera Santa Fe and Compañia Minera Santa Bárbara and made them part of Compañía de Acero del Pacífico.

== Bibliography ==
- Danús, Hernán (2007). "IV. La minería del hierro y la industria siderúrgica". Crónicas mineras de medio siglo (1950-2000) (in Spanish). Santiago de Chile: RIL Editores. ISBN 978-956-284-555-7.
- Jancsó, Katalin (2018). "Húngaros en la industria minera de Chile". Encuentros Europa-Iberoamérica en un mundo globalizado (in Spanish). Budapest: Centro Iberoaméricano, Universidad de Pécs. ISBN 978-615-5848-04-9.
- Millán, Augusto (1999). Historia de la minería del hierro en Chile (in Spanish). Santiago de Chile: Editorial Universitaria. ISBN 956-11-1499-2.
