= Compañía Minera del Pacífico =

Chilean mining company

- Trade name: CMP
- Company type: Subsidiary
- Industry: Mining
- Founded: 1981
- Headquarters: Santiago, Chile
- Key people: André Sougarret (CEO)
- Products: Iron ore, iron ore pellets
- Owner: Compañía de Acero del Pacífico (~75%); Mitsubishi Corporation (~25%); Others (<0.001%)
- Number of employees: 1,898 (2023); 4,953 contractors (2023)
- Parent: Compañía de Acero del Pacífico

Compañía Minera del Pacífico or CMP is a Chilean iron mining company which stands for 99% of Chilean iron exports as 2022. It was established in January 1981 when Compañía de Acero del Pacífico (CAP) was transformed into a holding company. The company has mining operations in the Chilean Iron Belt in the contiguous provinces of Copiapó, Huasco and Elqui.

The company operates the mine of El Romeral which uses the port of Guayacán in Coquimbo. At the port of Huasco it operates the Planta de Pellets which is supplied from the mine of Los Colorados.

Until 2010 it ran Los Colorados mine through Compañia Minera Huasco, a joint venture of CMP (50%) and Mitsubishi Corporation (50%). In 2010 Compañia Minera Huasco was folded into CMP and Mitsubishi Corporation obtained a 25% ownership of CMP; 15.9% by the folding and 9.1% by capital injection to CMP.

In 2017 CMP became member of Consejo Minero being the sole company in the guild engaged in the mining of iron.

From 1982 to 1985 the company went at loss but managed to break-even in 1987 and it continued thereafter with annual profits well over a decade.

== Former operations ==
The company mined iron ore at the volcano of El Laco in Antofagasta Region until 1996.

CMP supplied Planta de Pellets with ore from the mine of El Algarrobo until its closure in 1998.

== Bibliography ==
- Danús, Hernán (2007). "IV. La minería del hierro y la industria siderúrgica". Crónicas mineras de medio siglo (1950-2000) (in Spanish). Santiago de Chile: RIL Editores. ISBN 978-956-284-555-7.
- Jancsó, Katalin (2018). "Húngaros en la industria minera de Chile". Encuentros Europa-Iberoamérica en un mundo globalizado (in Spanish). Budapest: Centro Iberoaméricano, Universidad de Pécs. ISBN 978-615-5848-04-9.
- Millán, Augusto (1999). Historia de la minería del hierro en Chile (in Spanish). Santiago de Chile: Editorial Universitaria. ISBN 956-11-1499-2.
