= Huantemé =

Iron mine in Chile

- Location within Atacama Region Location within Chile
- Location: Atacama Region, Chile; 28°27′36.68″S 70°50′39.57″W
- Products: Iron
- Opened: c. 1952
- Closed: 1978

Huentemé is a closed iron mine in northern Chile about 15 km northwest of the city of Vallenar. The ore of the mine is one of various iron oxide-apatite (IOA) ores that are part of the north-south Chilean Iron Belt. In the 1950s Huantemé was the main mine exploited by Compañía Minera Santa Bárbara. The mining property was not Compañía Minera Santa Bárbara's but this company paid a fee to exploit it. In 1953 Hungarian immigrant Ladislao Darvasi was put in charge of the mine. The mine remained active through the Allende administrations nationalization of iron mines in 1971 and closed in 1978.

The iron ores at Huantemé have been deemed of good quality since it has ore grades of 66% iron and low contents of phosphorus and sulphur. The ore is made of magnetite with gangue minerals of actinolite, calcite and quartz. It is classified as a large deposit by the National Geology and Mining Service. Its near-surface extent runs a length of 500 m, and its shape has been described as irregular. Host rocks are volcanic and marine sedimentary rocks, all dating to the Upper Jurassic and Lower Cretaceous.

== Bibliography ==
- Jancsó, Katalin (2018). "Húngaros en la industria minera de Chile". Encuentros Europa-Iberoamérica en un mundo globalizado (in Spanish). Budapest: Centro Iberoaméricano, Universidad de Pécs. ISBN 978-615-5848-04-9.
- Millán, Augusto (1999). Historia de la minería del hierro en Chile (in Spanish). Santiago de Chile: Editorial Universitaria. ISBN 956-11-1499-2.
