= Arqueros Formation =

Early Cretaceous geological formation in Chile

- Stratigraphic range: Hauterivian-Barremian
- Type: Geological formation
- Underlies: Quebrada Marquesa Formation
- Overlies: La Negra Formation
- Thickness: ~850–1,230 m (2,790–4,040 ft)

Lithology
- Primary: Porphyritic andesite, limestone, calcareous sandstone, volcanic sandstone
- Other: Copper and manganese deposits

Location
- Coordinates: 24°1′51.70″S 68°11′44.79″W
- Region: Coquimbo Region
- Country: Chile
- Arqueros Formation (Chile)

The Arqueros Formation (Spanish: Formación Arqueros) is a volcanic, volcaniclastic, sedimentary, and fossiliferous geological formation that outcrops near in northwestern Coquimbo Region, northern Chile. It is dated back to the Hauterivian-Barremian stages of the Early Cretaceous. The lithology of the unit is composed of alternations of andesites and volcaniclastic rock layers and fossiliferous limestone of marine origin. The exposed parts of the formation run as a belt from north to south through the central part of the region. There are large outcrops of the formation in mountain plateaux north of Quebrada Marquesa, a tributary of Elqui River. These outcrops are thought to have originated by uplift of the region bounded by one normal fault to the west and one to the east.

The Arqueros Formation was first defined and described by Aguirre and Egert in 1962. Later, the work of Aguirre and Egert in 1970 described that five members could be identified in the formation, beginning with porphyritic andesites in the bottom (Ka1), overlaid by cherts, sandstones and limestones (Ka2), again overlain by a layer of porphyritic andesites (Ka3) and then followed by limestones, sandstones and andesites (Ka4). The stratigraphically uppermost layer, Mn1, is made of volcanic sandstones and manto-type copper and manto-type manganese deposits, and also lies typically 30 m from the roof of the formation.

The fossil content of the Arqueros Formation represents a marine invertebrate assemblage comprising bivalves, ammonites, corals, and they occur within the limestones of members Ka2 and Ka4. Abundant heteromorph ammonites have been reported from Quebrada de Los Choros, such as Crioceratites.
