= El Dorado mine =

El Dorado
- Location within Coquimbo Region Location within Chile
- Location: Coquimbo Region, Chile; 30°33′37.00″S 71°13′33.82″W
- Products: Iron ore concentrate
- Production: 4,500 to 100,000 tons contrate per month
- Financial year: 2022
- Company: Sociedad de Inversiones Tierra del Fuego

El Dorado is an open-pit iron mine near the city of Ovalle in north-central Chile, located 98 km southeast from the port of Coquimbo. A 1946 economic geology study by Carlos Ruiz Fuller and co-workers estimated the ore grade in El Dorado at 68% Fe, one of the highest in the Chilean Iron Belt. The mine had its main period of activity from 1952 to 1966 under the ownership of Compañía Minera Santa Fe but mining continued sporadically until 1971. The opening and successful operation of the mine in the 1950s –producing 45,000 tons of ore per month for much of that decade– is considered to have paved the way for the rise of the medium-scale iron mining in Chile in the 1960s and 1970s.

In the 2020s the mine have been operated and owned by Sociedad de Inversiones Tierra del Fuego Limitada with permits limited to extracting material from old waste rock dumps. In connection to this activity the mining company has been accused to engage in non-authorized mining of fresh ore.
