= Chilean Iron Belt =

Geological province in Chile

- Stratigraphic range: Cretaceous; ~132–84 Ma
- Type: Mining district

Location
- Coordinates: 27.366389°S 70.433056°W
- Region: Atacama Region, Coquimbo Region
- Country: Chile
- Extent: Atacama Fault System
- Chilean Iron Belt (Chile)

The Chilean Iron Belt is a geological province rich in iron ore deposits in northern Chile. It extends as a north-south belt along the western part of the Chilean regions of Coquimbo and Atacama, chiefly between the cities of La Serena and Taltal. The belt follows much of the Atacama Fault System and is about 600 km long and 25 km broad.

Iron oxide-apatite, iron oxide copper gold ore deposits (IOCG) and manto-type copper and silver are the main types of deposits. Iron-apatite and IOCG are considered to have different origins. Manto-type deposits are concentrated in the northern part of the belt and are chiefly emplaced on rocks of La Negra Formation. The belt host also significant resources of cobalt which were deemed by 2017 to have the potential to be extracted as by-products of iron and copper mining along the belt.

The ores of the Chilean Iron Belt formed in separate pulses in the Cretaceous period as result of magmatic and hydrothermal processes. At least part of the iron oxide-apatite rock originated from molten iron in the form of lava, tephra. and intrusions. Thus iron oxide apatite magma cooled into rock variously from surface volcanoes to depths of 10 km over even more. Various deposits are covered by continuous sheets alluvial sedmients that form plains on surface.

Some geologists have speculated that a large meteorite impact in the Pacific during the Cretaceous period may have set in motion a series of tectonic changes that led to the formation the ores.

Systematic survey of the iron ores of the belt for economic exploitation begun with civil engineer Carlos Vattier in the late 19th century and continued with Juan Brüggen who published a report on them in 1913. Mining engineer C. Linnemann took over government-commissioned studies at the recommendation of Brüggen and surveyed southern part of the belt in 1917 and 1918. Various ore deposits of the belt were studied by Carlos Ruiz Fuller and co-workers for aspects of their economic geology in the mid-1940s publishing a report in 1946. Studies on ore genesis in the iron belt were published by Ruiz Fuller and his co-workers in 1967 in Spanish and in 1968 in English.

== Iron mines along the Chilean Iron Belt ==
Active, closed and proposed mines in the iron belt in Atacama Region.
Active, closed and proposed mines in the iron belt in Coquimbo Region.
- Santo Domingo (planned)
- El Carmen
- Cerro Negro Norte
- Adrianitas (closed in the 1960s)
- Cerro Imán (closed in 1980)
- Los Colorados
- Boquerón Chañar (closed in the 1960s)
- Huantemé (closed in 1978)
- El Algarrobo (closed in 1998)
- Incahuasi
  - Cristales
  - El Pleito
  - Zapallo
- Dominga (planned)
- El Tofo (closed 1974)
- El Romeral
- El Dorado (closed in 1971)
