= Medium-scale mining =

Medium-scale mining refers to mining that is larger than artisanal or small-scale mining but smaller than large-scale mining. Its exact definition may vary by country and also between different organizations within a country. Some criteria are based on the yearly man-hours employed in the mining operation and others on either the total mass ore extracted, the mass of metal (or non-metallic mineral) extracted or the dry-equivalent mass of ore concentrate produced.

== Definitions ==
The Chilean mining guild Sociedad Nacional de Minería (SONAMI) defines medium-scale mining as those producing copper in the range of 1,500 to 50,000 metric tons per year. For the mining of other metals and non-metallic mining SONAMI's definition of medium-scale mining is based on equivalents on the tonnage that defines medium-scale copper mining. For Chile's National Geology and Mining Service medium-scale mining is that which employ between 1 million and 200 thousand man-hours per year, which is equivalent to a full-time workforce of between 80 and 400 persons. For Chilean state-owned company Empresa Nacional de Minería (ENAMI) medium-scale mining is different from the small scale mining in that it has a monthly produce of exceeding one of the following; 300 metric tons of dry copper concentrate, 150 metric tons of dry gold-silver concentrate, 100 metric tons of dry copper precipitate or else a total produce of 10,000 metric tons of mineral. The Chilean Copper Commission uses a definition offered by the Instituto de Ingenieros de Minas de Chile in 1990 which considers medium-scale mining as those mining companies producing between 3,000,000 and 100,000 metric tons of copper yearly (8,000 to 300 dayly). In Peru the law Ley General de Minería defines medium-scale mining as that which has a dayly produce of in the range from 350 to 5,000 metric tons ore concentrate or more processed ore.

== Medium-scale mining in Chile ==
Location of mining districts in Chile where medium-scale mining is dominant.

In Chile medium-scale mining (Spanish: mediana minería) is concentrated near roads or other pre-existing infrastructure, and lie thus away from the high Andes where nearly all mines belong to the large-scale mining category. For mines with an annual produce of less than 10,000 metric tons a simplified mine closure procedure apply in Chile. ENAMI has in its role the purchase of ore from medium and small-scale mining which it does at stabilized prices to avoid volatility. There are multiple policies in Chile that tend to group media and small-scale mining together. Medium-scale mining in Chile tend to focus on copper and produced about 4.5% of the copper mined in the country from 2017 to 2021, with Chile being the world's largest producer of copper.

Medium-scale mining in Chile has a high rate of success in the environmental impact assessments with an approval rate of 92% from 2017 to 2022. Yet these approvals last each for a few years as projects submitted by medium-scale mining involve short time-frames. A 2017 study show that medium-scale mining in Chile is 23% less efficient in its use of water relative to large-scale mining, yet it has been suggested to be in favourable conditions to apply environmental techniques such as dry tailings relative to large-scale mining.

== Bibliography ==
- Guajardo, Juan Carlos; Marañón, Matías; Ciudad, Juan Cristóbal; del Mauro, Bastián; Nicolás, Muñóz; Fiorella, Ulloa (2023). Caracterización de la mediana minería en Chile [Characterization of medium-scale mining in Chile] (PDF) (Report) (in Spanish). Centro de Estudios y Documentación Mineros de SONAMI.
- Andrade, Sebastián; Muñoz, Felipe; Salazar, Reinaldo (2025). Distritos productivos para el desarrollo de la minería chilena [Productive districts for the development of mining in Chile] (Report) (in Spanish). Centro de Estudios y Documentación Mineros de SONAMI.
- Ulloa Urrutia, Alfie; Contreras Biekert, José Luis; Gana Aravena, Joaquín; Miranda Toledo, Rodrigo; Chauveau Gerber, Paul; Villalobos Valenzuela, Fernando; Farías Soto, Javiera (2017). Productividad en la Gran Minería del Cobre (in Spanish). Comisión Nacional de Productividad. ISBN 978-956-7725-08-3.
