= CAP S.A. =

Chilean holding company

Pacific Steel Company Group
- Native name: Compañía de Acero del Pacífico
- Company type: Sociedad Anónima
- Traded as: BCS: CAP
- Industry: Mining & Steel Production
- Founded: 1946
- Headquarters: Santiago, Chile
- Key people: Rodolfo Krause, (Chairman); Erick Weber, (CEO)
- Products: Iron & Steel
- Revenue: ▼US$ 2.4 billion (2012)
- Net income: ▼US$ 327.5million (2012)
- Number of employees: 4,067
- Subsidiaries: Compañía Minera del Pacífico
- Website: www.cap.cl

The Pacific Steel Company (CAP, from Spanish: Compañía de Acero del Pacífico) (doing business as Grupo CAP), is a Chilean holding company of the mining and steel sectors. These sectors are represented by different affiliates. Its main facilities are at Huachipato near the port of Talcahuano in Bío Bío Region.

The first stage is done through Compañía Minera del Pacífico and involves the extraction and concentration of iron ore from the company's deposits in a geological area known as the Chilean Iron Belt in northern Chile. This production is sold as raw material between steel producers, mainly in the Asian market (China, Japan, Malaysia, Korea and Indonesia).

The second stage is done through Compañía Siderúrgica Huachipato and involves the use in Chile on behalf of CAP for the production of iron ore to produce flat and long steel, for the most varied industries.

The third and final phase of CAP's activity, using in turn part of steel production, is the creation of developments in steel, processed by subsidiaries in Chile, for use in construction, industry and infrastructure services that also marketed by subsidiaries in other countries of our region. This stage of CAP's activity is through Cintac S.A. and Intasa S.A. and their respective subsidiaries.

CAP is listed on the Santiago Stock Exchange in the IPSA index.

== History ==
As result of Allende's nationalization of the mining industry in the early 1970s Compañía de Acero del Pacífico obtained ownership of the iron mines of El Tofo and El Romeral. Later the ownership of this mine passed to Compañía Minera del Pacífico as it was privatized during the Pinochet dictatorship.
