= Editorial Universitaria =

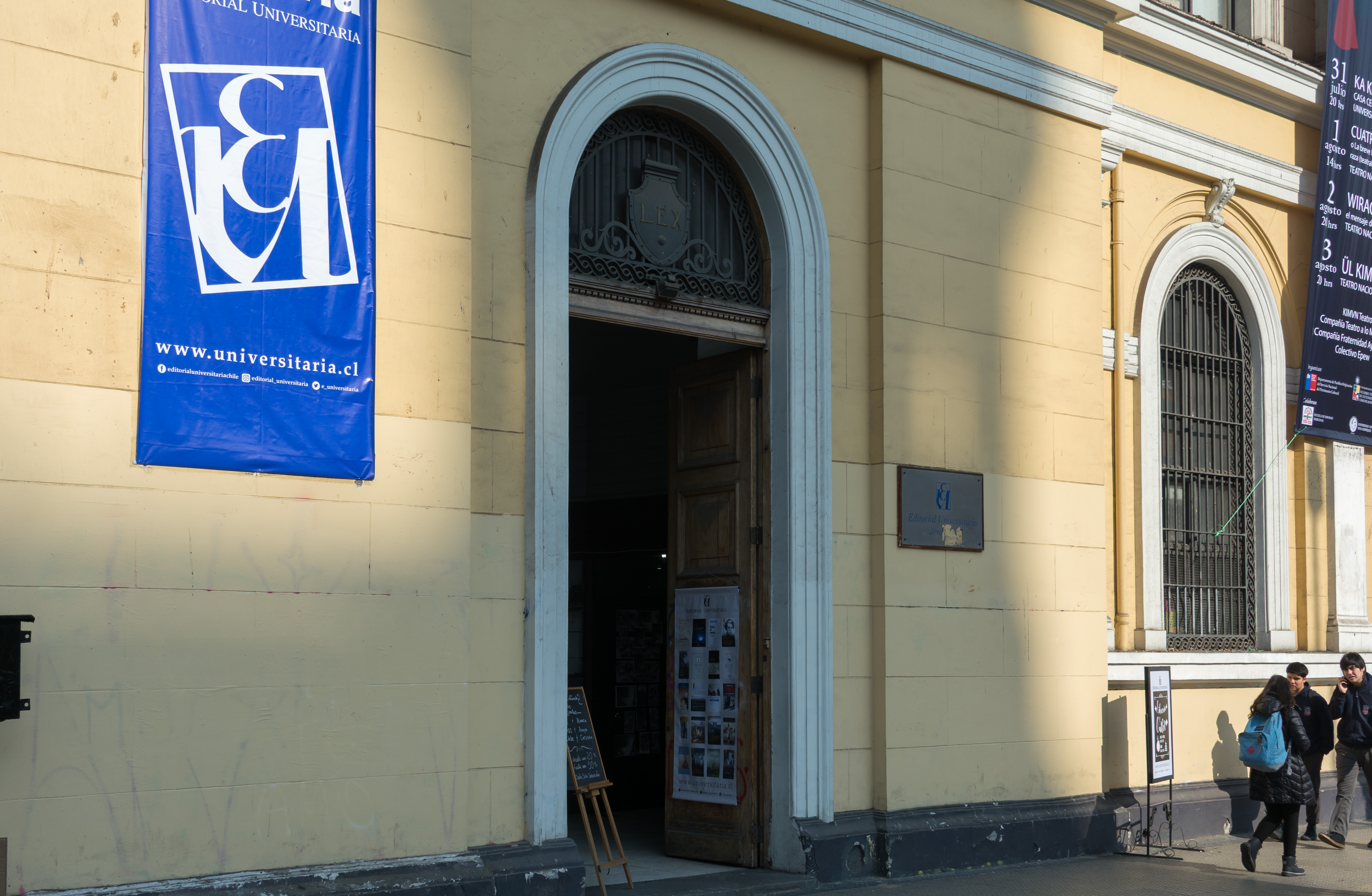
University Bookstore, Santiago, Metropolitan Region of Santiago, Chile

Editorial Universitaria is a Chilean university press based in Santiago. It was established in 1947 with funds from private people and from the University of Chile. During its existence, it has published the works of generations of influential Chilean scientists and intellectuals.

The press publishes, among other things, children's literature.
