= Economic and Social Stabilization Fund =

The Economic and Social Stabilization Fund (ESSF) is a state-owned fund in Chile aimed at stabilizing the finances of the Central Government in face of potential "abrupt changes in the economic cycle and extraordinary events". It was created in 2007 by the merger of the former Copper Stabilization Fund (Spanish: Fondo de Compensación para los ingresos del Cobre) and of the stabilization resources created by Decreto Ley N° 3.653 of 1981. The fund is also used yearly to amortize part of the public debt and to add to the Pension Reserve Fund. The fund is subject to the Fiscal Responsibility Law.

The Copper Stabilization Fund was created in 1987 basing it on the incomes of the state-owned copper mining company Codelco. This allowed for more precise annual government budget planning given that copper prices can exhibit strong fluctuations.

In 2019, the fund was ranked fourth out of 64 sovereign wealth funds worldwide, with a score of 92 out of 100, in the Sovereign Wealth Fund Transparency and Accountability Scoreboard published by the Peterson Institute for International Economics.

== See also ==
- Copper mining in Chile
- Sovereign wealth fund

== Bibliography ==
- Ceballos, Juan Ignacio; Tilton, John (2005). "Análisis del Fondo de Compensación del Cobre Chile". In Lagos, Gustavo (ed.). Minería y desarrollo (in Spanish). Santiago, Chile: Ediciones Universidad Católica de Chile. pp. 295–318. ISBN 956-14-0844-9.
