= Copper extraction =

Process of extracting copper from the ground

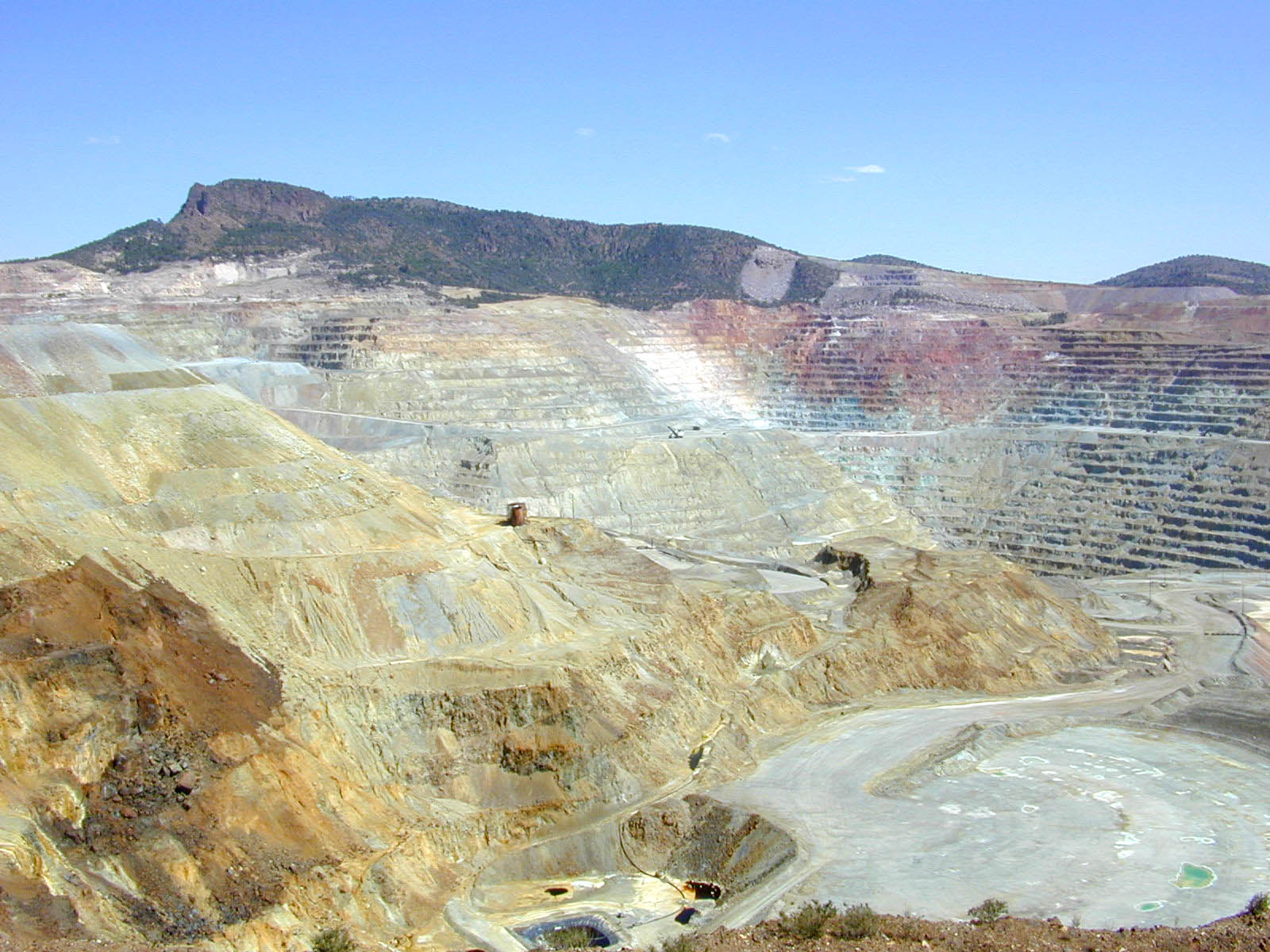
The Chino open-pit copper mine in New Mexico

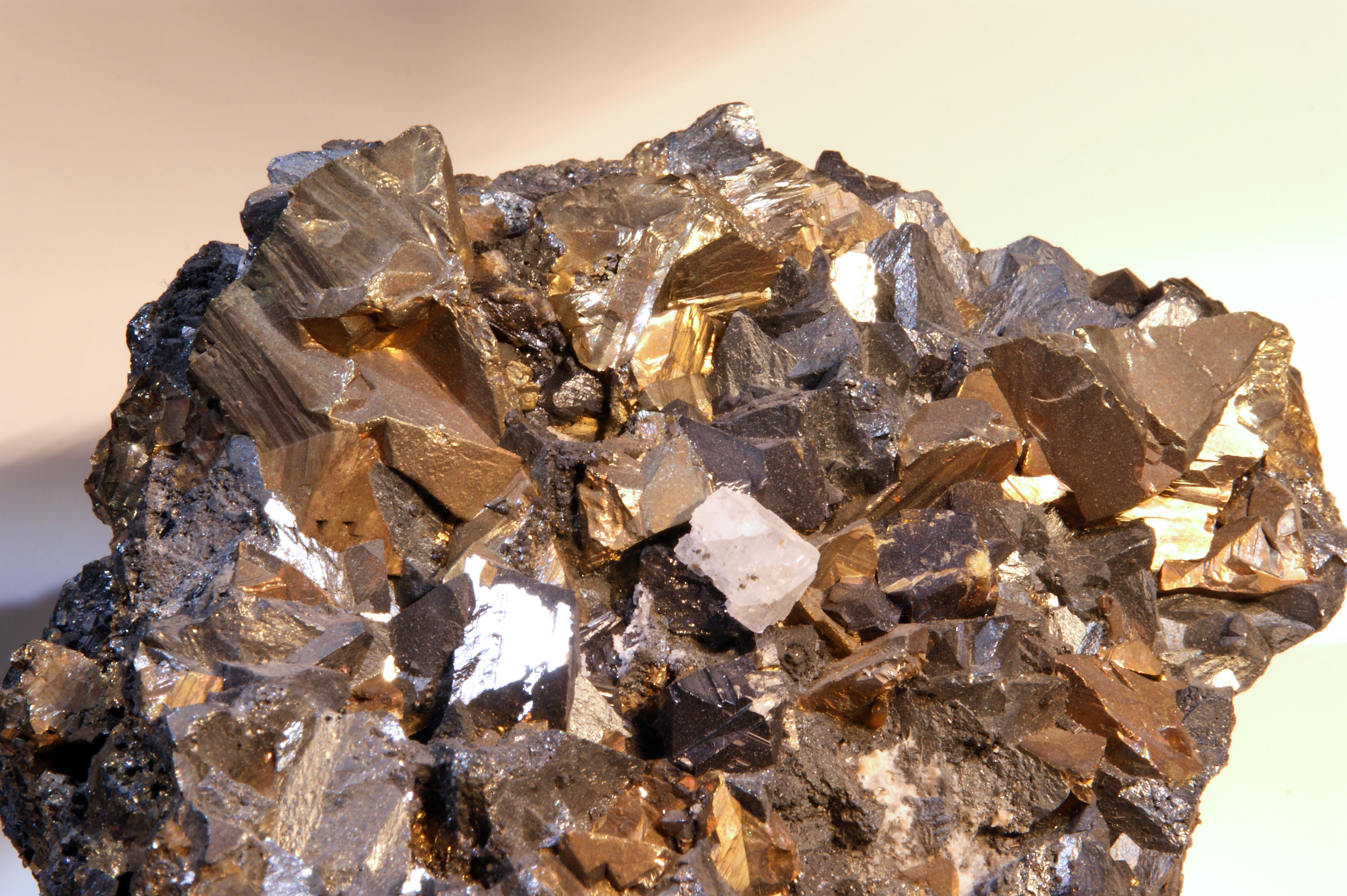
Chalcopyrite specimen from Huarón mine, Peru

Copper extraction is the multi-stage process of obtaining copper from its ores. The conversion of copper ores consists of a series of physical, chemical, and electrochemical processes. Methods have evolved and vary with country depending on the ore source, local environmental regulations, and other factors. The copper smelters with the highest production capacity (metric tons of copper yearly) lie in China, Chile, India, Germany, Japan, Peru and Russia. China alone has over half of the world's production capacity and is also the world's largest consumer of refined copper.

Precious metals and sulfuric acid are often valuable by-products of copper refining. On the contrary, sulfuric acid is also needed consumable for the extraction of copper from oxides in leaching piles. Arsenic is the main type of impurity found in copper concentrates to enter smelting facilities. There has been an increase in arsenic in copper concentrates over the years since shallow, low-arsenic copper deposits have been progressively depleted.

== History ==
=== Prehistory ===
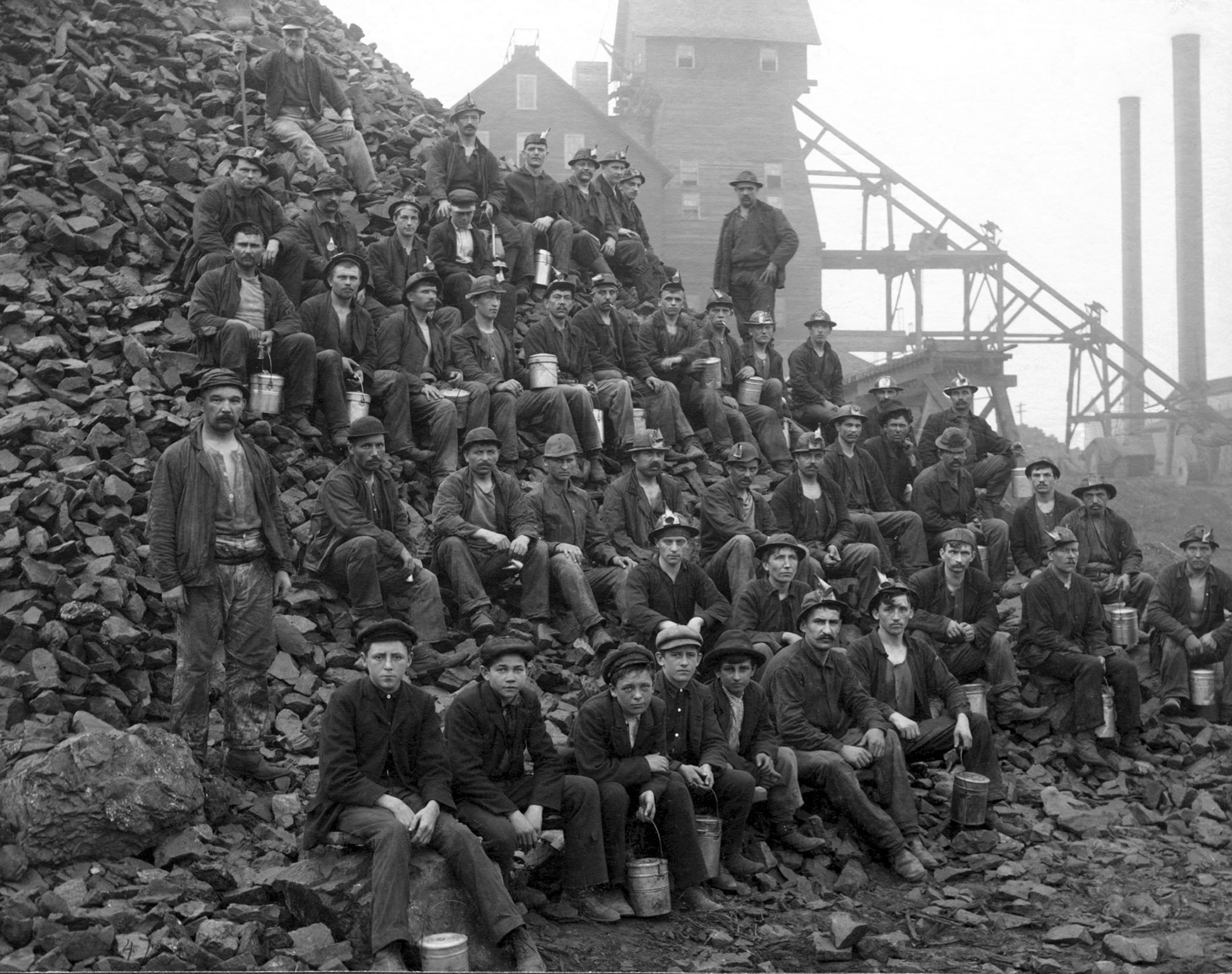
Miners at the Tamarack mine in Copper Country, in 1905

The Old Copper Complex in North America has been radiometrically dated to around 6500 BCE, at least—making it one of the oldest known examples of copper extraction in the world. The earliest evidence of the cold-hammering of native copper comes from the excavation at Çayönü Tepesi in eastern Anatolia, which dates between 7200 and 6600 BCE. Among the various items considered to be votive or amulets, there was one that looked like a fishhook and one like an awl. Another find, at Shanidar Cave in Mergasur, Iraq, contained copper beads, and dates back to 8,700 BCE.

One of the world's oldest known copper mines, as opposed to usage of surface deposits, is at Timna Valley, Israel, and has been used since the fourth millennium BC, with surface deposit usage occurring in the fifth and sixth millennium.

The Pločnik archaeological site in southeastern Europe (Serbia) contains the oldest securely dated evidence of copper making at high temperature, from 5,000 BCE. The find in June 2010 extends for an additional 500 years, dated to 5th millennium BCE, representing the earlier record of copper smelting from Rudna Glava (Serbia).

The earliest copper work in the Atacama Desert and the Andean world as a whole dates to 1432–1132 BC. Ice core studies in Bolivia suggest copper smelting may have begun as early as 700 BC, over 2700 years ago. Various sites of Pre-Hispanic mines and metallurgical workshops have been identified in the Atacama Desert including those with remnants of chisels, casting waste and workshop debris. Tin bronze, arsenical bronze, and arsenical copper were valuable goods produced in the Inca Empire. About 74 km northeast of the Chilean city of Copiapó in Viña del Cerro the Incas had one of their largest mining and metallurgy centres at Qullasuyu. There is evidence of gold, silver and copper metallurgy at the site, including the production of bronze. When conquistador Diego de Almagro traversed the Atacama Desert in 1536 his men readily obtained copper horseshoes for their horses.

Copper smelting technology gave rise to the Copper Age, aka the Chalcolithic Age, and then the Bronze Age. The Bronze Age would not have been possible without the development of smelting technology.

=== 19th century ===
The introduction of reverberatory furnaces to Chile around 1830 by Charles Saint Lambert revolutionized Chilean copper mining. In addition to this there was improvements of transport caused by the development of railroads and steam navigation. Prospector José Tomás Urmeneta discovered rich orebodies at Tamaya in 1850, a site that became one of Chile's main copper mines. All of this made Chile supply 18% of the copper produced worldwide in the 19th century and the country was from the 1850s to the 1870s the world's top producer. In some years Chile's copper production made up about 60% of the world’s output and its export tariff made up more than half the state's income.

Lambert's success in modernising the Chilean copper industry during the second quarter of the nineteenth century is thought to have sowed the seeds for the later demise of his own copper smelting business (among others) in Swansea.

By the late 19th century the Chilean mining industry once again lagged behind technological developments (e.g. flotation, leaching, large-scale open-pit mining) contributing to the drop of its share of the world production to 5–6% in the 1890s and similar shares remained in the 1900s and 1910s reaching a low of 4.3% in 1914. Up to the 1940s and 1950s there was also a notable lack of major copper exploration efforts by large mining companies that relied on purchasing prospects already known from the activity of small-scale miners and pirquineros.

=== Smelting ===
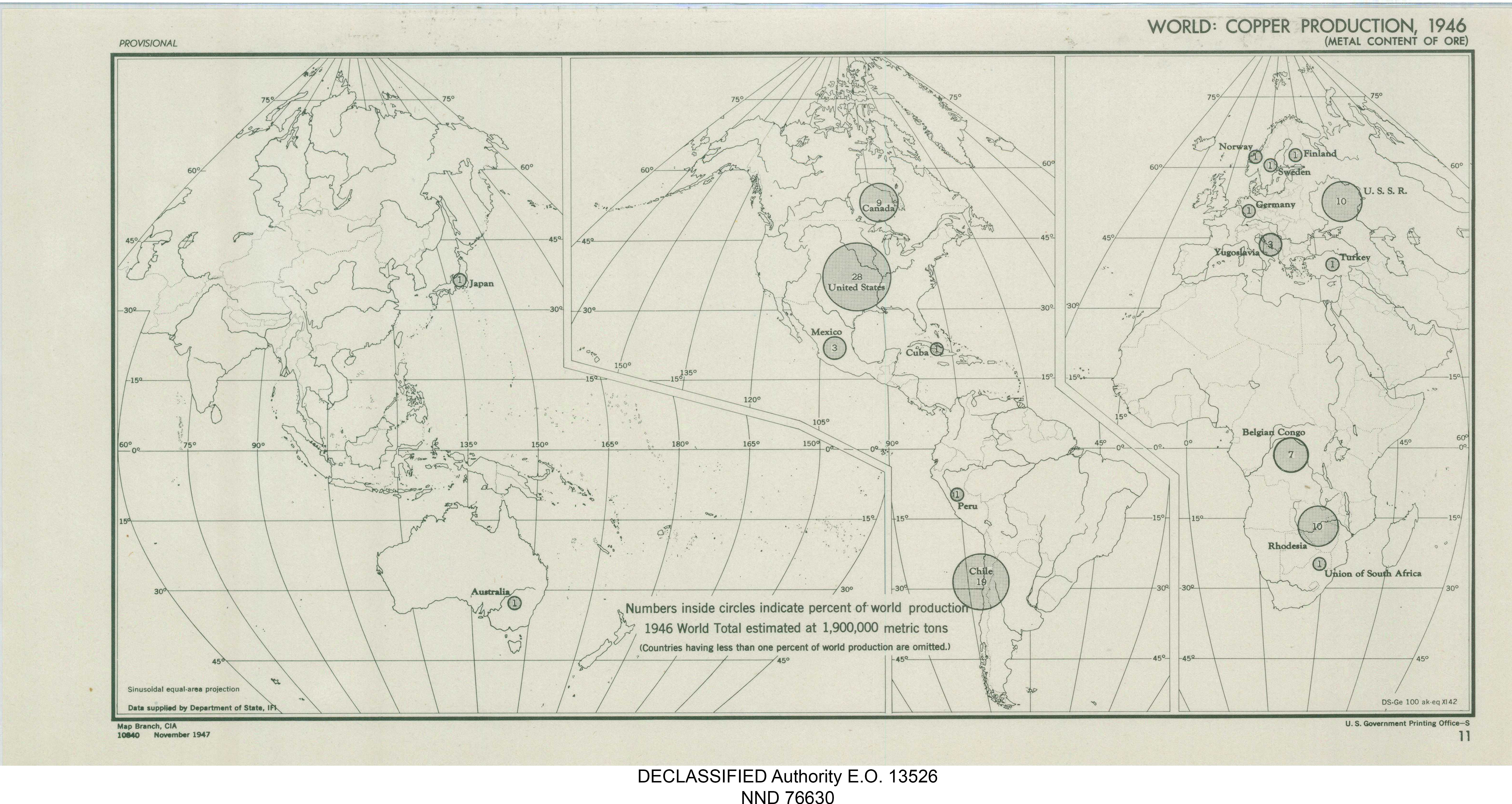
World copper production, 1946

Until the latter half of the 20th century, smelting sulfide ores was almost the sole means of producing copper metal from mined ores (primary copper production). As of 2002, 80% of global primary copper production was from copper–iron–sulfur minerals, and the vast majority of these were treated by smelting.

Copper was initially recovered from sulfide ores by directly smelting the ore in a furnace. The smelters were initially located near the mines to minimize the cost of transport. This avoided the prohibitive costs of transporting the waste minerals and the sulfur and iron present in the copper-containing minerals. However, as the concentration of copper in the ore bodies decreased, the energy costs of smelting the whole ore also became prohibitive, and it became necessary to concentrate the ores first.

Initial concentration techniques included hand-sorting and gravity concentration. These resulted in high losses of copper. Consequently, the development of the froth flotation process was a major step forward in mineral processing. The modern froth flotation process was independently invented in the early 1900s in Australia by C.V Potter and around the same time by G. D. Delprat. It made the development of the giant Bingham Canyon mine in Utah possible.

In the twentieth century, most ores were concentrated before smelting. Smelting was initially undertaken using sinter plants and blast furnaces, or with roasters and reverberatory furnaces. Roasting and reverberatory furnace smelting dominated primary copper production until the 1960s.

=== Late 20th century trends ===
In the 1960s and 1970s large copper mining operations by United States (U.S.) owned companies were nationalized in many of the main copper producing countries. Thus by the 1980s state owned enterprises overtook the dominant role U.S. companies like Anaconda Copper and Kennecott had had until then. In the late 1970s and early 1980s various oil companies like ARCO, Exxon Minerals, and Standard Oil Company expanded into copper mining for a few years before selling their copper assets. Reportedly gains were not as high as anticipated. Investments in copper mining concentrated in Chile in the 1980s and 1990s given that copper mining in other countries faced problems like political instability (Peru), increased environmental requirements (developed countries), or overall disinterest in foreign investment in a nationalized mining industry (Zaire, Zambia).

=== 21st century ===
In the 2013-2023 period the copper smelting capacity in China and Zambia have increased while the capacity in Chile and the United States have decreased. China has by far the largest capacity for copper smelting with over half of the world's total. Besides the previously mentioned countries other countries where there is a significant installed cathode production capacity of the world's total as of 2023 are Japan (8%), Russia (5%), Poland (3-4%) and Bulgaria (3-4%).

Since the 1990s no new copper smelter have been built in Chile. Following the 2022 closure of Fundición Ventanas in central Chile there have been a public discussion on building a new large copper smelter in Chile. Antofagasta Region or Atacama Region has been proposed by Chilean industry scholars as viable replacements. Others have argued for keeping smelting in Valparaíso Region given the existence of nearby mines. While some argue the replacement plant should be near the coast, inland Chuquicamata and El Salvador have also been proposed as alternatives. The president of the National Mining Society (Sonami), Diego Hernández, estimates the construction period for a new smelter plant to be 5 to 7 years. A 2024 study identified Antofagasta Region as the best place for a new copper smelter given logistical advantages and an existing and expandable supply of copper concentrate from nearby mines.

The Guixi Smelter in inland southeastern China is the world's largest copper smelter by capacity. In 2015 it had an annual production capacity of 900,000 tons of copper.

== Concentration (beneficiation) ==
The decreasing concentration of copper in ores now requires pre-treatment of ores.

The average grade of copper ores in the 21st century is below 0.6% copper, with a proportion of economic ore minerals being less than 2% of the total volume of the ore rock. Thus, all mining operations, the ore must usually be beneficiated (concentrated). The concentrate is typically sold to distant smelters, although some large mines have smelters located nearby. Such colocation of mines and smelters was more typical in the 19th and early 20th centuries, when smaller smelters could be economic. The subsequent processing techniques depend on the nature of the ore.

In the usual case when it is primarily sulfide copper minerals (such as chalcopyrite, FeCuS_{2}), the ore is treated by comminution, where the rock is crushed to produce small particles (<100 μm) consisting of individual mineral phases. These particles are then ready to be separated to remove gangue (silicate rocks residues) using froth flotation.

=== Froth flotation ===
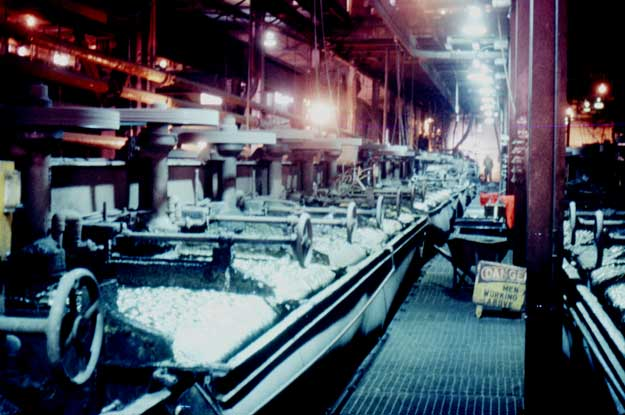
Froth flotation cells to concentrate copper and nickel sulfide minerals, Falconbridge, Ontario.

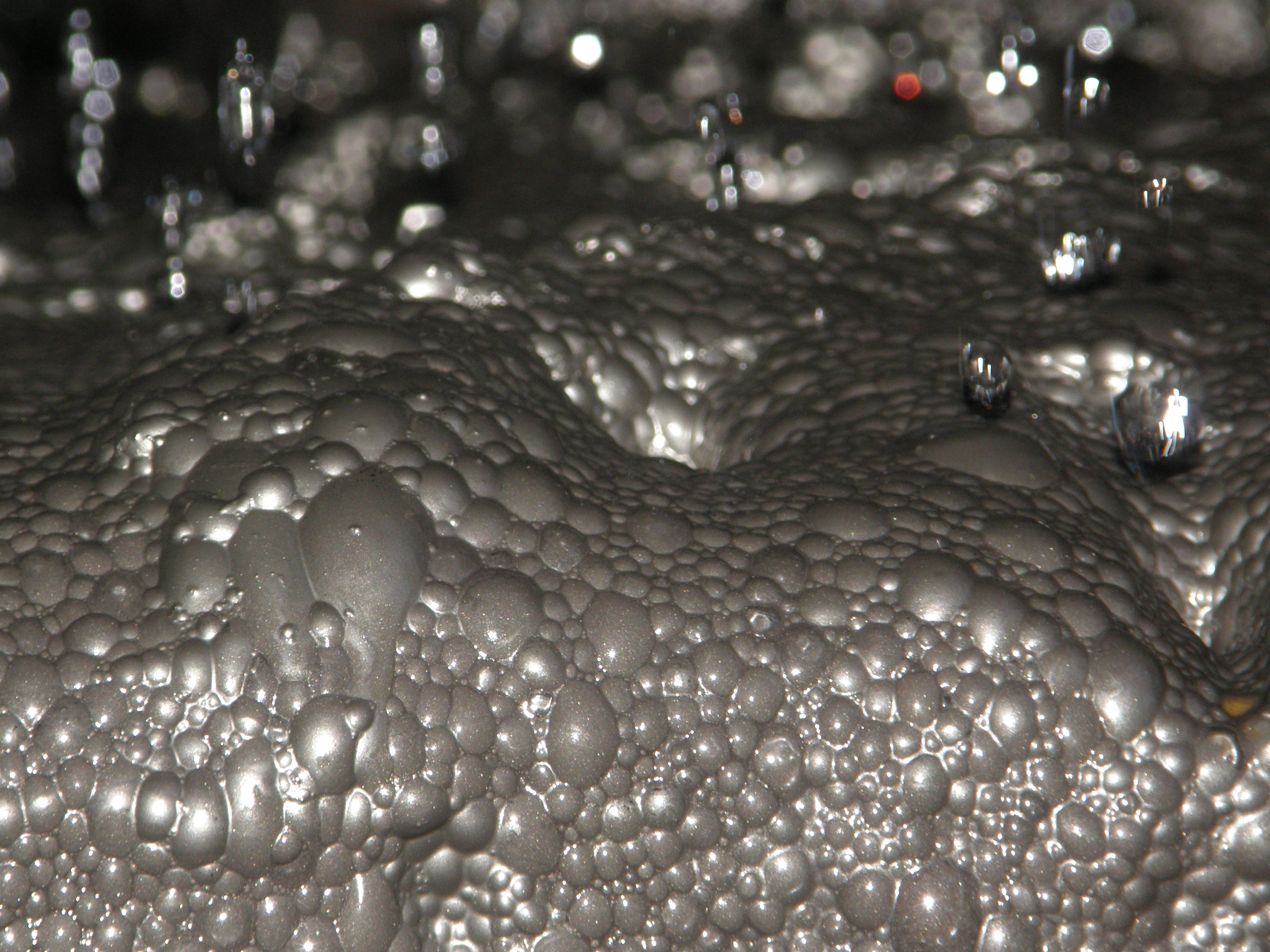
Copper sulfide loaded air bubbles on a Jameson Cell at the flotation plant of the Prominent Hill mine in South Australia

In froth flotation, the crushed ore is wetted, suspended in a slurry, and mixed with reagents that render the sulfide particles hydrophobic. Typical reagents ("collectors") include potassium ethylxanthate and sodium ethylxanthate, but dithiophosphates and dithiocarbamates are also used. The slurry is introduced to a water-filled aeration tank containing a surfactant such as methylisobutyl carbinol (MIBC).

Air is constantly forced through the slurry. The air bubbles attach to the hydrophobic copper sulfide particles, which are conveyed to the surface where the froth is skimmed off. These skimmings are generally subjected to a cleaner-scavenger cell to remove excess silicates and to remove other sulfide minerals that can deleteriously impact the concentrate quality (typically, galena), and the final concentrate is sent for smelting.

The rock that has not floated off in the flotation cell is either discarded as tailings or further processed to extract other metals such as lead (from galena) and zinc (from sphalerite), should they exist. A variety of measures are taken to improve the efficiency of the froth flotation. Lime is used to raise the pH of the water bath, causing the collector to bond more efficiently to the copper sulfides. The process can produce concentrates with 27–29% and 37–40% copper contents from chalcopyrite and chalcocite, respectively.

=== Hydrometallurgy ===
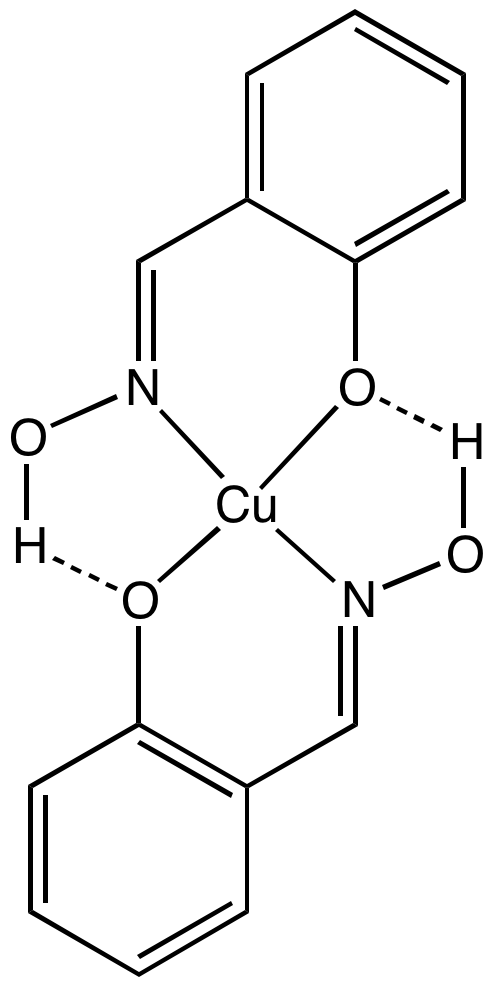
In some hydrometallurgical schemes, copper(II) is extracted from aqueous solution as by complexation to salicylaldoxime.

Oxidised copper ores include carbonates such as azurite and malachite, the silicate chrysocolla, and sulfates such as chalcanthite. In some cases, sulfide ores are allowed to degrade to oxides. Such ores are amenable to hydrometallurgy. Specifically, such oxide ores are usually extracted into aqueous sulfuric acid, usually in a heap leaching or dump leaching. The resulting pregnant leach solution is purified by solvent extraction (SX). It is treated with an organic solvent and an organic chelators. The chelators bind the copper ions (and no other ions, ideally), the resulting complexes dissolve in the organic phase. This organic solvent is evaporated, leaving a residue of the copper complexes. The copper ions are liberated from the residue with sulfuric acid. The barred (denuded) sulfuric acid recycled back on to the heaps. The organic ligands are recovered and recycled as well. Alternatively, the copper can be precipitated out of the pregnant solution by contacting it with scrap iron; a process called cementation. Cement copper is normally less pure than SX-EW copper.

=== Specialized ores ===
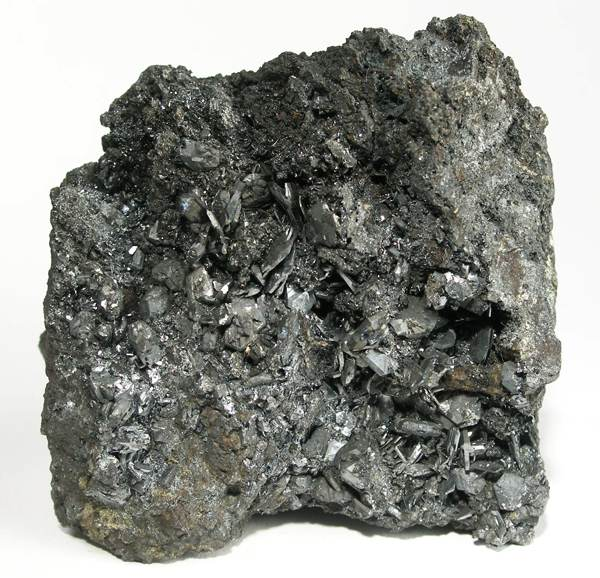
A specimen of the mineral chalcocite from the Geevor Mine, Cornwall.

Secondary sulfides—those formed by supergene secondary enrichment—are resistant (refractory) to sulfuric leaching. Secondary copper sulfides are dominated by the mineral chalcocite; a mineral formed from primary sulfides, like chalcopyrite, that undergo chemical processes such as oxidation or reduction. Typically, secondary sulfide ores are concentrated using froth flotation. Other extraction processes like leaching are effectively used for the extraction of secondary copper sulfides, but as demand for copper rises, extraction processes tailored for low-grade ores are required, due to the depletion of copper resources. Processes including in situ, dump, and heap leaching are cost-effective methods that are suitable for extracting copper from low-grade ores.

Extraction processes for secondary copper sulfides and low-grade ores includes the process of heap bioleaching. Heap bioleaching presents a cost efficient extraction method that requires a less intensive energy input resulting in a higher profit. This extraction process can be applied to large quantities of low-grade ores, at a lower capital cost with minimal environmental impact.

Generally, direct froth flotation is not used to concentrate copper oxide ores, as a result of the largely ionic and hydrophilic structure of the copper oxide mineral surface. Copper oxide ores are typically treated via chelating-reagent flotation and fatty-acid flotation, which use organic reagents to ensure adsorption onto the mineral surface through the formation of hydrophobic compounds on the mineral surface.

Some supergene sulfide deposits can be leached using a bacterial oxidation heap leach process to oxidize the sulfides to sulfuric acid, which also allows for simultaneous leaching with sulfuric acid to produce a copper sulfate solution. For oxide ores, solvent extraction and electrowinning technologies are used to recover the copper from the pregnant leach solution. To ensure the best recovery of copper, it is important to acknowledge the effect copper dissolution, acid consumption, and gangue mineral composition has on the efficacy of extraction.

Supergene sulfide ores rich in native copper are refractory to treatment with sulfuric acid leaching on all practicable time scales, and the dense metal particles do not react with froth flotation media. Typically, if native copper is a minor part of a supergene profile it will not be recovered and will report to the tailings. When rich enough, native copper ore bodies may be treated to recover the contained copper by gravity separation. Often, the nature of the gangue is important, as clay-rich native copper ores prove difficult to liberate. This is because clay minerals interact with flotation reagents used in extraction processes, that are then consumed, which results in minimal recovery of a high grade copper concentrate.

== Roasting ==
The roasting process is generally undertaken in combination with reverberatory furnaces. In the roaster, the copper concentrate is partially oxidised to produce "calcine". Sulfur dioxide is liberated. The stoichiometry of the reaction is:

CuFeS_{2} + 3 O_{2} → 2 FeO + 2 CuS + 2 SO_{2}

Roasting generally leaves more sulfur in the calcined product (15% in the case of the roaster at Mount Isa Mines) than a sinter plant leaves in the sintered product (about 7% in the case of the Electrolytic Refining and Smelting smelter).

As of 2005, roasting is no longer common in copper concentrate treatment because its combination with reverberatory furnaces is not energy efficient and the SO_{2} concentration in the roaster offgas is too dilute for cost-effective capture. Direct smelting is now favored, and uses the following smelting technologies: flash smelting, Isasmelt, Noranda, Mitsubishi or El Teniente furnaces.

=== Smelting ===
Replacement of reverberatory furnace smelting by flash smelting, related to the number of copper smelters using this technology.

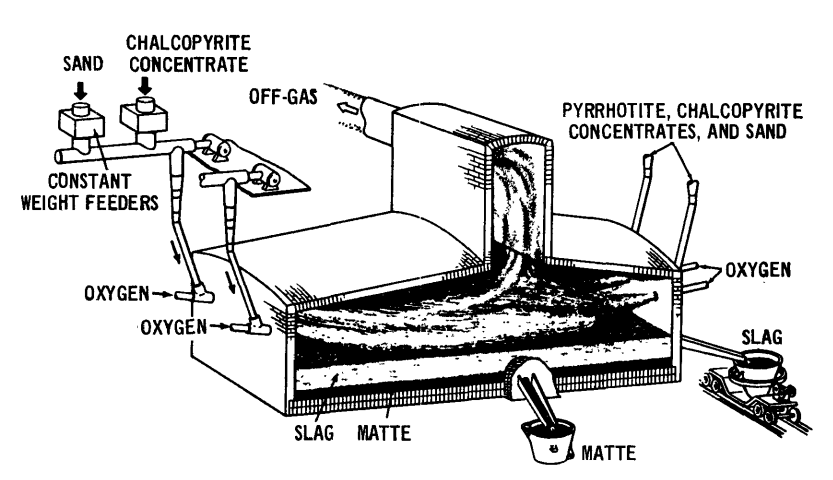
Flash smelting furnace from Inco

The initial melting of the material to be smelted is usually referred to as the smelting or matte smelting stage. It can be undertaken in a variety of furnaces, including the largely obsolete blast furnaces and reverberatory furnaces, as well as flash furnaces, Isasmelt furnaces, etc. The product of this smelting stage is a mixture of copper, iron and sulfur that is enriched in copper, which is called matte or copper matte. The term matte grade is normally used to refer to the copper content of the matte.

The purpose of the matte smelting stage is to eliminate as much of the unwanted iron, sulfur and gangue minerals (such as silica, magnesia, alumina and limestone) as possible, while minimizing the loss of copper. This is achieved by reacting iron sulfides with oxygen (in air or oxygen enriched air) to produce iron oxides (mainly as FeO, but with some magnetite (Fe_{3}O_{4})) and sulfur dioxide.

Copper sulfide and iron oxide can mix, but when sufficient silica is added, a separate slag layer is formed. Adding silica also reduces the melting point (or, more properly, the liquidus temperature) of the slag, meaning that the smelting process can be operated at a lower temperature.

The slag forming reaction is:

FeO + SiO_{2} → FeO.SiO_{2}

Slag is less dense than matte, so it forms a layer that floats on top of the matte.

Copper can be lost from the matte in three ways: as cuprous oxide (Cu_{2}O) dissolved in the slag, as sulfide copper dissolved in the slag or as tiny droplets (or prills) of matte suspended in the slag.

The amount of copper lost as oxide copper increases as the oxygen potential of the slag increases. The oxygen potential generally increases as the copper content of the matte is increased. Thus, the loss of copper as oxide increases as the copper content of the matte increases.

On the other hand, the solubility of sulfidic copper in slag decreases as the copper content of the matte increases beyond about 40%. Nagamori calculated that more than half the copper dissolved in slags from mattes containing less than 50% copper is sulfidic copper. Above this figure, oxidic copper begins to dominate.

The loss of copper as prills suspended in the slag depends on the size of the prills, the viscosity of the slag and the settling time available. Rosenqvist suggested that about half the copper losses to slag were due to suspended prills.

The mass of slag generated in the smelting stage depends on the iron content of the material fed into the smelting furnace and the target matte grade. The greater the iron content of the feed, the more iron that will need to be rejected to the slag for a given matte grade. Similarly, increasing the target matte grade requires the rejection of more iron and an increase in the slag volume.

Thus, the two factors that most affect the loss of copper to slag in the smelting stage are:

- matte grade
- mass of slag.

This means that there is a practical limit on how high the matte grade can be if the loss of copper to slag is to be minimized. Therefore, further stages of processing (converting and fire refining) are required.

The following subsections briefly describe some of the processes used in matte smelting.

==== Reverberatory furnace smelting ====
Reverberatory furnaces are long furnaces that can treat wet, dry, or roasted concentrate. Most of the reverberatory furnaces used in the latter years treated roasted concentrate because putting dry feed materials into the reverberatory furnace is more energy efficient, and because the elimination of some of the sulfur in the roaster results in higher matte grades.

The reverberatory furnace feed is added to the furnace through feed holes along the sides of the furnace, and the solid charge is melted. Additional silica is normally added to help form the slag. The furnace is fired with burners using pulverized coal, fuel oil or natural gas.

Reverberatory furnaces can additionally be fed with molten slag from the later converting stage to recover the contained copper and other materials with a high copper content.

Because the reverberatory furnace bath is quiescent, very little oxidation of the feed occurs (and thus very little sulfur is eliminated from the concentrate). It is essentially a melting process. Consequently, wet-charged reverberatory furnaces have less copper in their matte product than calcine-charged furnaces, and they also have lower copper losses to slag. Gill quotes a copper in slag value of 0.23% for a wet-charged reverberatory furnace vs 0.37% for a calcine-charged furnace.

In the case of calcine-charged furnaces, a significant portion of the sulfur has been eliminated during the roasting stage, and the calcine consists of a mixture of copper and iron oxides and sulfides. The reverberatory furnace acts to allow these species to approach chemical equilibrium at the furnace operating temperature (approximately 1600 °C at the burner end of the furnace and about 1200 °C at the flue end; the matte is about 1100 °C and the slag is about 1195 °C). In this equilibration process, oxygen associated with copper compounds exchanges with sulfur associated with iron compounds, increasing the iron oxide content of the furnace, and the iron oxides interact with silica and other oxide materials to form the slag.

The main equilibration reaction is:

Cu_{2}O + FeS → Cu_{2}S + FeO

The slag and the matte form distinct layers that can be removed from the furnace as separate streams. The slag layer is periodically allowed to flow through a hole in the wall of the furnace above the height of the matte layer. The matte is removed by draining it through a hole into ladles for it to be carried by crane to the converters. This draining process is known as tapping the furnace. The matte taphole is normally a hole through a water-cooled copper block that prevents erosion of the refractory bricks lining the furnace. When the removal of the matte or slag is complete, the hole is normally plugged with clay, which is removed when the furnace is ready to be tapped again.

Reverberatory furnaces were often used to treat molten converter slag to recover contained copper. This would be poured into the furnaces from ladles carried by cranes. However, the converter slag is high in magnetite and some of this magnetite would precipitate from the converter slag (due to its higher melting point), forming an accretion on the hearth of the reverberatory furnace and necessitating shut downs of the furnace to remove the accretion. This accretion formation limits the quantity of converter slag that can be treated in a reverberatory furnace.

While reverberatory furnaces have very low copper losses to slag, they are not very energy-efficient and the low concentrations of sulfur dioxide in their off-gases make its capture uneconomic. Consequently, smelter operators devoted a lot of money in the 1970s and 1980s to developing new, more efficient copper smelting processes. In addition, flash smelting technologies had been developed in earlier years and began to replace reverberatory furnaces. By 2002, 20 of the 30 reverberatory furnaces still operating in 1994 had been shut down.

==== Flash furnace smelting ====
In flash smelting, the concentrate is dispersed in an air or oxygen stream and the smelting reactions are largely completed while the mineral particles are still in flight. The reacted particles then settle in a bath at the bottom of the furnace, where they behave like calcine in a reverberatory furnace. A slag layer forms on top of the matte layer, and they can separately be tapped from the furnace.

==== ISASMELT ====
The installed feed capacity of Isasmelt furnaces has grown as the technology has been accepted in smelters around the world.

The ISASMELT process is an energy-efficient smelting process that was jointly developed from the 1970s to the 1990s by Mount Isa Mines (a subsidiary of MIM Holdings and now part of Glencore) and the Government of Australia's CSIRO. It has relatively low capital and operating costs for a smelting process.

ISASMELT technology has been applied to lead, copper, and nickel smelting. As of 2021, 22 plants were in operation in eleven countries, along with three demonstration plants located at Mt Isa. The installed capacity of copper/nickel operating plants in 2020 was 9.76 million tonnes per year of feed materials and 750 thousand tonnes per year across lead operating plants.

Smelters based on the copper ISASMELT process are among the lowest-cost copper smelters in the world.

=== Converting ===
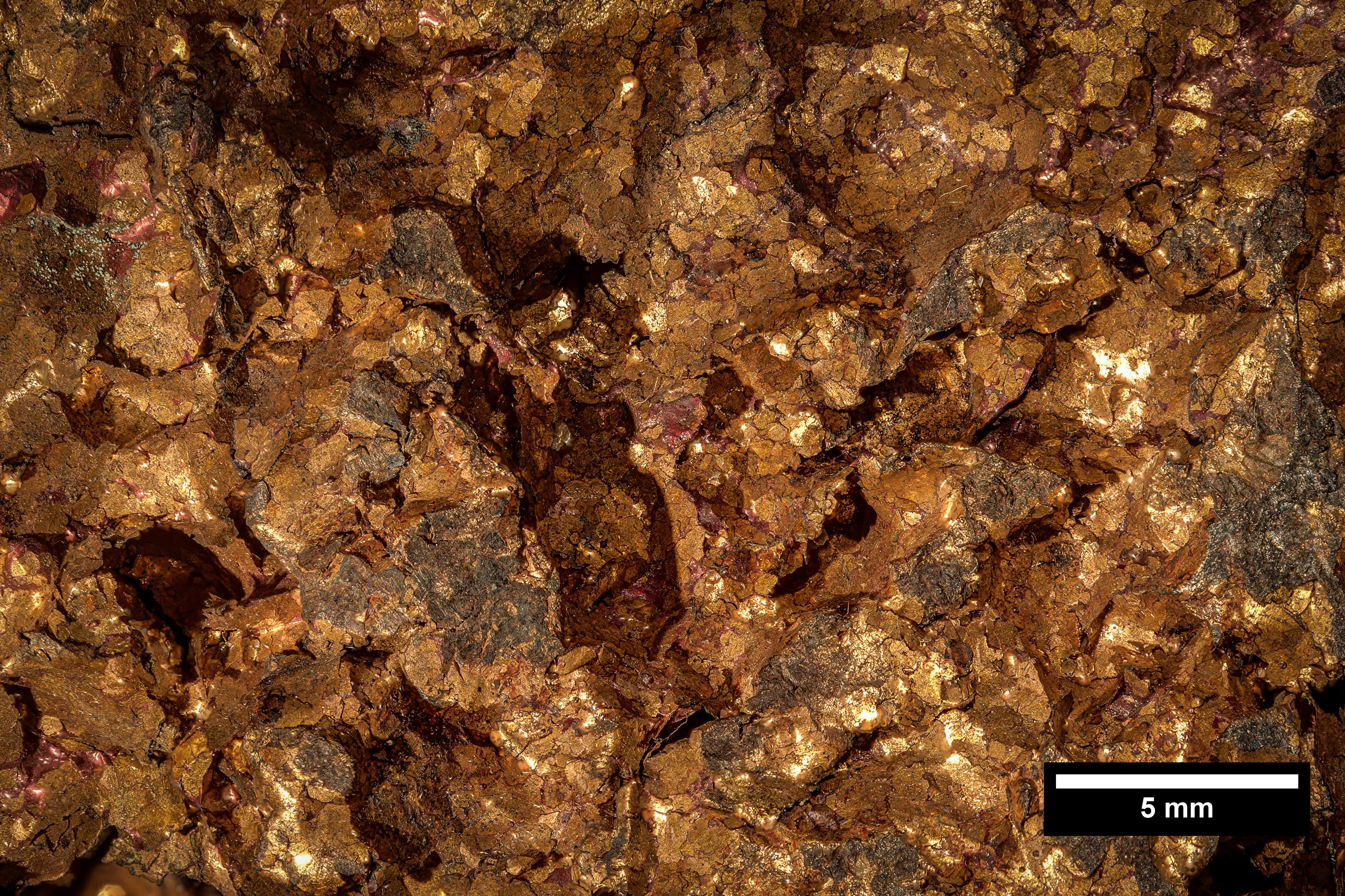
Oxygen-free copper aka "Tough-pitch" copper (ca. 98% pure), containing antimony and nickel

The matte, which is produced in the smelter, contains 30–70% copper (depending on the process used and the operating philosophy of the smelter), primarily as copper sulfide, as well as iron sulfide. The sulfur is removed at a high temperature as sulfur dioxide by blowing air through molten matte:

2 CuS + 3 O_{2} → 2 CuO + 2 SO_{2}

CuS + O_{2} → Cu + SO_{2}

In a parallel reaction the iron sulfide is converted to slag:

2 FeS + 3 O_{2} → 2 FeO + 2 SO_{2}
2 FeO + SiO_{2} → Fe_{2}SiO_{4}

The purity of this product is 98%, it is known as blister because of the broken surface created by the escape of sulfur dioxide gas as blister copper pigs or ingots are cooled. By-products generated in the process are sulfur dioxide and slag. The sulfur dioxide is captured and converted to sulfuric acid and either sold on the open market or used in copper leaching processes.

== Refining ==
=== Fire refining ===
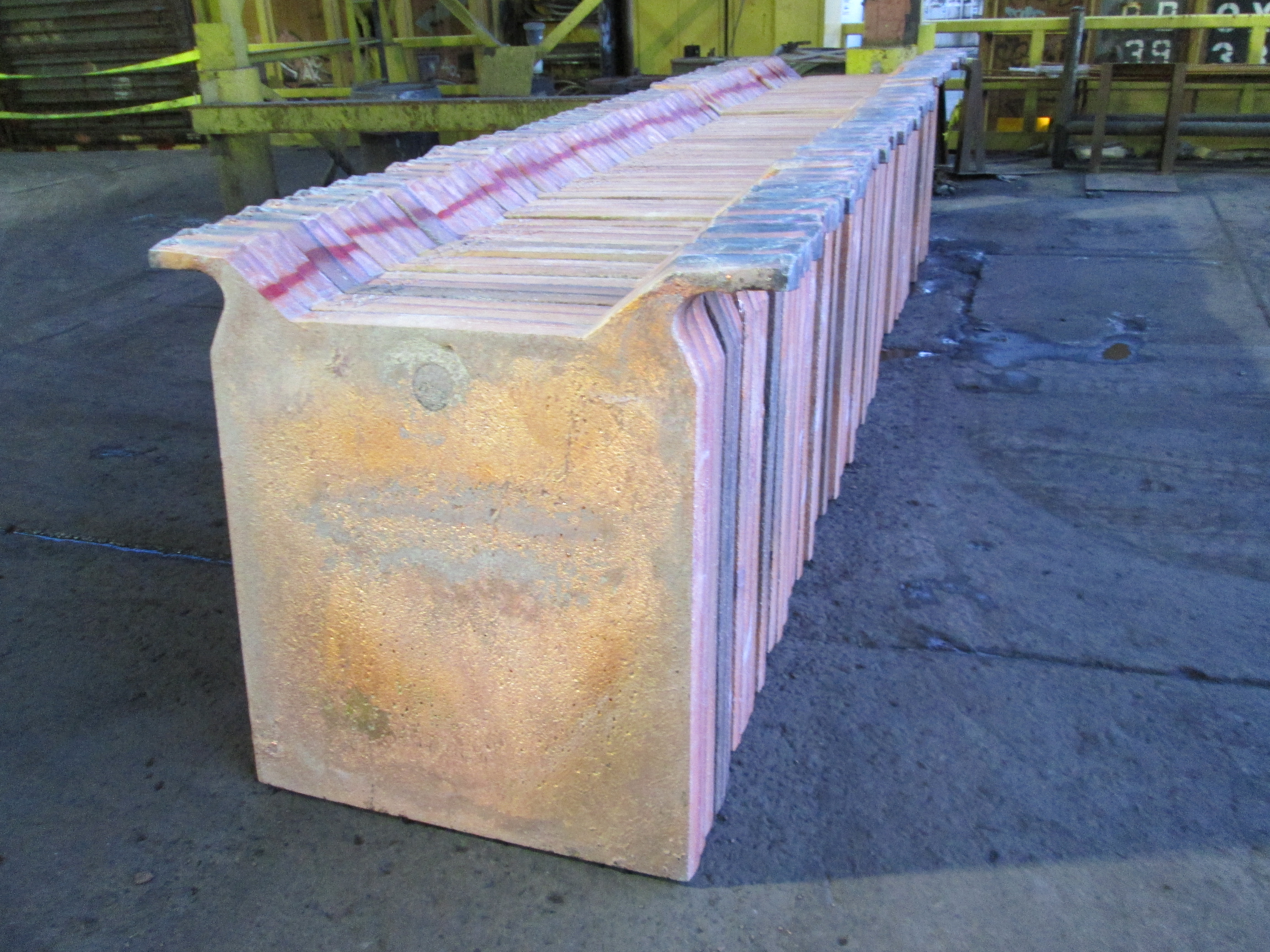
Copper anodes after fire refining and casting.

The blister copper is put into an anode furnace, a furnace that refines the blister copper to anode-grade copper in two stages by removing most of the remaining sulfur and iron, and then removing oxygen introduced during the first stage. This second stage, often referred to as poling is done by blowing natural gas, or some other reducing agent, through the molten copper oxide. When this flame burns green, indicating the copper oxidation spectrum, the oxygen has mostly been burned off. This creates pyrometallurgically refined copper at about 99% pure.

=== Electrolysis ===
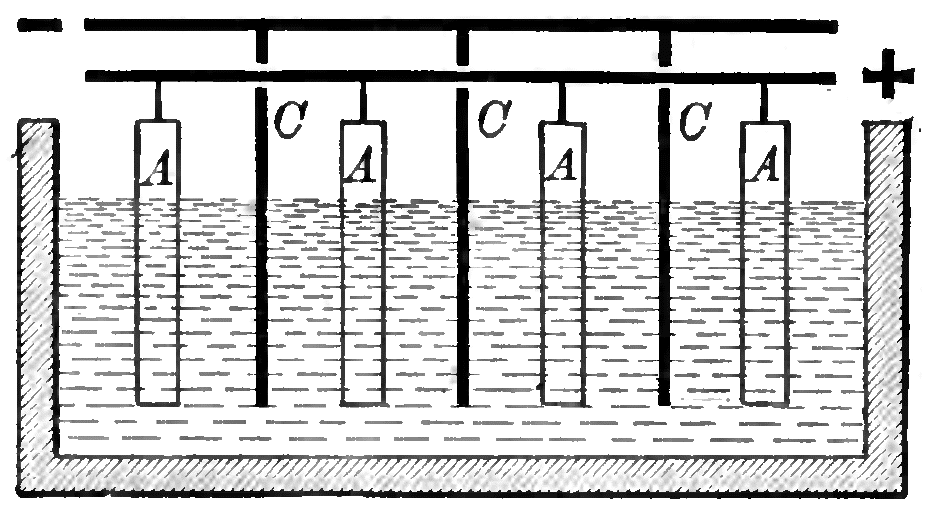
Apparatus for electrolytic refining of copper

The final stage in the production of copper is electrorefining. Refining is achieved by electrolysis, which exploits the easy (low potential) and selective conversion of copper(II) solutions to the metal. The anodes cast from processed blister copper are placed into an aqueous solution of 3–4% copper sulfate and 10–16% sulfuric acid. Cathodes are thin rolled sheets of highly pure copper or, more commonly these days, reusable stainless steel starting sheets (as in the IsaKidd process). A potential of only 0.2–0.4 volts is required for the process to commence. In industrial plants current densities up to 420 A/m^{2} are possible.

At the anode (oxidation reaction), copper and less noble metals dissolve. More noble metals and less soluble elements such as silver, gold, selenium, and tellurium settle to the bottom of the cell as anode slime, which forms a salable by-product. Copper(II) ions migrate through the electrolyte to the cathode. At the cathode (reduction reaction), Cu^{2+} ions are reduced in copper metal and Cu_{(s)} plates out, but less noble constituents such as arsenic and zinc remain in solution unless a higher voltage is used.

The reactions involving metallic copper and Cu^{2+} ions at the electrodes are the following:

– At the anode	(oxidation and dissolution)	: Cu_{(s)}	→ Cu^{2+} + 2 e^{−}
– At the cathode	(reduction and precipitation)	: Cu^{2+} + 2 e^{−}	→ Cu_{(s)}

== Concentrate and copper marketing ==
Copper concentrates produced by mines are sold to smelters and refiners who treat the ore and refine the copper and charge for this service via treatment charges (TCs) and refining charges (RCs). The TCs are charged in US$ per tonne of concentrate treated and RCs are charged in cents per pound treated, denominated in US dollars, with benchmark prices set annually by major Japanese smelters. The customer in this case can be a smelter, who on-sells blister copper ingots to a refiner, or a smelter-refiner which is vertically integrated.

One prevalent form of copper concentrate contains gold and silver, like the one produced by Bougainville Copper Limited from the Panguna mine from the early 1970s to the late 1980s.

The typical contract for a miner is denominated against the London Metal Exchange price, minus the TC-RCs and any applicable penalties or credits. Penalties may be assessed against copper concentrates according to the level of deleterious elements such as arsenic, bismuth, lead or tungsten. Because a large portion of copper sulfide ore bodies contain silver or gold in appreciable amounts, a credit can be paid to the miner for these metals if their concentration within the concentrate is above a certain amount. Usually the refiner or smelter charges the miner a fee based on the concentration; a typical contract will specify that a credit is due for every ounce of the metal in the concentrate above a certain concentration; below that, if it is recovered, the smelter will keep the metal and sell it to defray costs.

Copper concentrate is traded either via spot contracts or under long term contracts as an intermediate product in its own right. Often the smelter sells the copper metal itself on behalf of the miner. The miner is paid the price at the time that the smelter-refiner makes the sale, not at the price on the date of delivery of the concentrate. Under a Quotational Pricing system, the price is agreed to be at a fixed date in the future, typically 90 days from time of delivery to the smelter.

A-grade copper cathode is of 99.99% copper in sheets that are approximately 1 meter square; thickness and weight depend on manufacturer. Typical 1 cm thick sheet weighs approximately 200 pounds (about 90 kg). It is a true commodity, deliverable to and tradeable upon the metal exchanges in New York City (COMEX), London (London Metals Exchange) and Shanghai (Shanghai Futures Exchange). Often copper cathode is traded upon the exchanges indirectly via warrants, options, or swap contracts such that the majority of copper is traded upon the LME/COMEX/SFE, but delivery is achieved directly, logistically moving the physical copper, and transferring the copper sheet from the physical warehouses themselves.

The chemical specification for electrolytic grade copper is ASTM B 115-00 (a standard that specifies the purity and maximum electrical resistivity of the product).

== See also ==
- Biomining
- Category:Copper minerals
- Copper mining in the United States
- Extractive metallurgy
- In-situ leach
- List of copper mines
- List of countries by copper production
- Metallurgy
- 2000s commodities boom
- Hubbert peak theory
- List of copper alloys
- Mineral resource classification
- Peak minerals

== Bibliography ==
- Camus, Francisco (2005). "La minería y la evolución de la exploración en Chile". In Lagos, Gustavo (ed.). Minería y desarrollo (in Spanish). Santiago, Chile: Ediciones Universidad Católica de Chile. pp. 229–270. ISBN 956-14-0844-9.
- Gill, C. B. (1980) Nonferrous Extractive Metallurgy, John Wiley and Sons: New York, ISBN 0-471-05980-3
- Sagredo, Rafael (2005). "Chile, país minero". In Lagos, Gustavo (ed.). Minería y desarrollo (in Spanish). Santiago, Chile: Ediciones Universidad Católica de Chile. pp. 271–294. ISBN 956-14-0844-9.
- Sutulov, Alexander (1975). "Antecedentes históricos de la producción de cobre en Chile". In Sutulov, Alexander (ed.). El Cobre Chileno (in Spanish). Corporación Nacional del Cobre de Chile. pp. 1–62.
