= Cosayach =

Chilean chemical company and iodine producer

SCM Cosayach
- Type: Sociedad Contractual Minera
- Industry: Chemicals and mining
- Founded: 1985
- Founder: Francisco Javier Errázuriz
- Headquarters: Santiago, Chile
- Products: Iodine
- Website: www.cosayach.cl

Compañía de Salitre y Yodo or Cosayach is a Chilean chemical company and a supplier of iodine. It is Chile's second largest iodine producer after Sociedad Química y Minera while Chile is the world's largest iodine producer. The company owns 200,000 ha's of land hosting 300,000 tons of iodine and 50 million tons of nitrate in the Atacama Desert in Tarapacá Region. Cosayach has a processing plant in the village of Cala-Cala in the commune of Pozo Almonte. In 2024 the company obtained a permit from National Geology and Mining Service to operate its iodine plant until 2030.
