= Pension Reserve Fund of Chile =

Sovereign wealth fund of Chile

The Pension Reserve Fund (PRF) of Chile is a sovereign wealth fund established on 28 December 2006 with an initial contribution of $604.5 million. It was established in response to Chile’s new demographic scenario characterised by an increase in life expectancy and the growth of senior citizen population, adding on yet another challenge for the government in terms of greater future retirement expenditures and the need to guarantee basic solidarity pensions to those who were not able to save enough for their retirement. At the end of July 2007, the PRF had a total of $1.37 billion worth of assets under its management.

The fund receives annual transfers from the Economic and Social Stabilization Fund which is partly based on incomes from the state-owned copper mining company Codelco.

== History ==
In 2006, Chile passed the Fiscal Responsibility Law which would involve the creation of two new sovereign wealth funds, the first of which was the Pension Reserve Fund. Its primary purpose was to provide funding for the government’s pension obligations and help pay for the projected increase in the minimum pension benefit and take-up rate.
