= Lithium mining in Chile =

Location of the main lithium mining sites in Chile and processing sites.

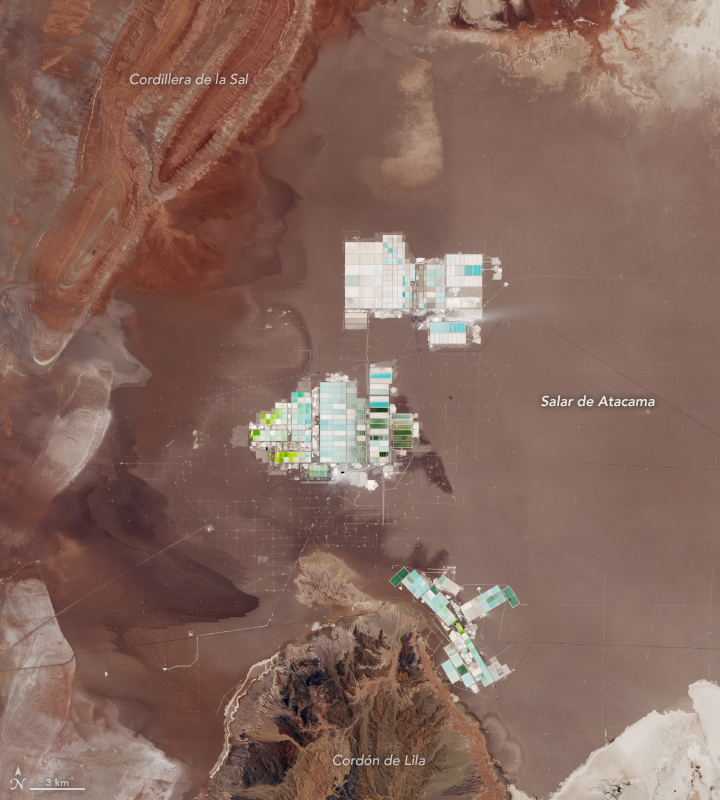
NASA satellite image showing Albemarle Corporation's evaporation pools for lithium extraction in Salar de Atacama

Lithium mining in Chile is the second largest in the world in terms of extraction after it was surpassed by Australia in 2012. (Note: In 2016, having ramped-up its production, Chile was again the main producer but lost that position in 2017 when production in Australia rose dramatically.) Chile, like Argentina and Bolivia, is located within the Lithium Triangle, an area of South America that houses the largest known reserves of lithium on the planet. Likewise, Chilean mining leads the world in the extraction of lithium through an evaporation process from brines with high concentrations of this mineral, unlike Australian mining, which extracts it mainly from hard rocks. (Note: An example of hard rock lithium mining in Australia is the Greenbushes mine near Perth.) Estimates show that Chile is expected to be surpassed also by Argentina and China in lithium production by 2030. Industry analyst Gustavo Lagos suggests that lithium production in Chile will by 2030 represent be about 8% of the world's total production. Chile has the world's cheapest production costs for lithium and this could be an advantage for mining in Chile once recycled lithium enters the market competing with costly mining operations in the future.

Most of Chile's lithium reserves are in Salar de Atacama and Salar de Maricunga, and all lithium extracted in Chile as of 2023 comes from Salar de Atacama. The only two lithium-extracting companies currently operating in Chile, SQM and Albemarle, have licences to extract lithium until 2030 and 2043 respectively. In April 2023 Chilean government announced plans for nationalizing its lithium industry. The state-owned copper company Codelco was commissioned by the government to negotiate nationalization with SQM.

In 2025 the company Nova Andino Litio was established as joint venture of Codelco and SQM. In the agreement that created Nova Andino Litio Codelco maintains control of the assets while SQM runs the operation in Salar de Atacama. The setup of the company gives the Chilean state most of the income of the company in the form of an approximate 70% of the operating margin "associated with new production". Beginning in 2031 the Chilean state is expected to obtain 85% of the operating margin associated with new production. This last mentioned income is divided between taxes, payments to Corfo and profits for Codelco.

== Environmental impact ==
A 2024 cradle-to-gate water-footprint analysis of lithium production at the Salar de Atacama reported potential water-scarcity impacts of 442 m³ world-equivalents per tonne using the AWARE method (and 5.5 m³ world-equivalents using WAVE+), with concentrated brine production dominating the footprint.

== National Lithium Strategy ==
The National Lithium Strategy (Spanish: Estrategía Nacional del Litio) is a policy of the Chilean state aimed to develop lithium extraction –of which Chile currently ranks second in the world– "to increase wealth for the country" and to link "Chile's economic development with the shift towards a global green economy". The policy aims to create the following entities, the state-owned mining company National Lithium Company, the Protected Salt Flats Network and the Public Technological and Research Institute of Lithium and Salt Flats. The National Lithium Company and the Chilean Economic Development Agency (CORFO) will join to form the Committee on Lithium and Salt Flats.

This policy was announced in 2023 by President Gabriel Boric.
