= Gustavo Lagos =

Chilean academic

Gustavo Lagos Cruz-Coke is a Chilean academic who studies the Chilean mining industry and in particular copper mining in the country. He is one of the founders of Centro de Estudios del Cobre y la Minería (CESCO) established in 1986. Lagos studied originally mining engineering in the University of Chile from 1968 to 1973. He has also been mentioned as a "pioneer" of the studies of lithium mining in Chile by El Mostrador with particular reference to his 1986 book El litio, un nuevo recurso para Chile. He obtained a doctorate from the University of Leeds where he carried out research in the team led by M. Stanley Whittingham. He has influenced Estrategia Nacional del Litio, Chile's national policy on the lithium industry announced by President Gabriel Boric in 2023.

Lagos has also served as an economic advisor on the prices of copper for the Ministry of Finance and the Directorate of Budgets.
