= Metal prices =

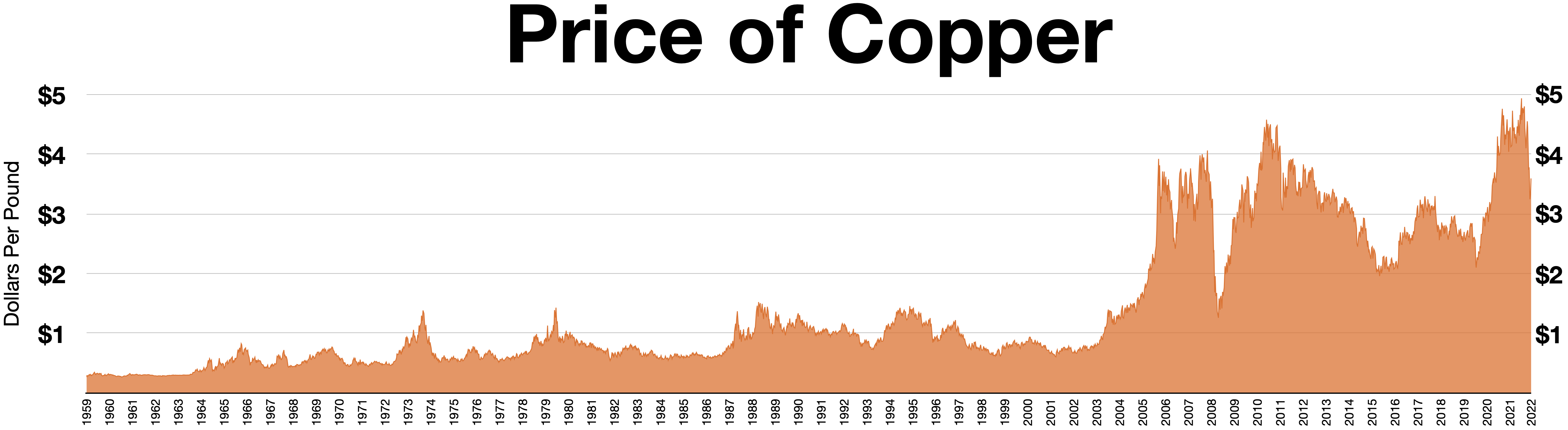
Price of copper 1959-2022

Metal prices are the prices of metal as a commodity that are traded in bulk at a predefined purity or grade. Metal can be split into three major categories, precious metals, industrial metals and other metals.

Precious metals and industrial metals are priced by trading of those metals on commodities exchanges. Other metals are traded on demand and the buyers and sellers themselves set the price sometimes using third party companies that set a reference or indicative price.

Precious metals include gold, silver, platinum and palladium and are normally priced by the ounce or gram. Industrial metals include aluminium alloy, aluminium, copper, lead, nickel, tin, zinc, cobolt, iron ore and Nasaac (North American special aluminium alloy) are exchange traded commodities and are normally priced by the metric ton. Other metals include bismuth, selenium, tellurium, and many others including rare earth metals are traded directly between suppliers and users.

The London Metal Exchange is an example of a metals exchange where metal is traded providing pricing for defined purity and contract size. The LME Copper contract for example is for delivery of 25 tonnes of Grade A copper cathode at a specified location and priced in United States dollars. This is used to set the price of copper globally. Periods of high copper prices such as 2011–2014 and 2021 have led to renewed interest on aluminium as substitute.

From around 1970 to 2010 iron ore prices used to be fixed by agreement of large mining companies and the steel industry.

== Pricing providers ==
There are companies which provide a pricing service set the price by talking to producers, traders and consumers. These prices are more an indication than an actual exchange price.

Unlike the prices on an exchange, pricing providers tend to give a weekly or bi-weekly price. For each commodity they quote a range (low and high price) which reflect the buying and selling about 9-fold due to China's transition from light to heavy industry and its focus on manufacturing. (China became the world's largest consumer of iron ore in 2003, and accounts for over half of global metal consumption.)

== Metal grades ==
The commodities quoted have a specific grade and quality of the forms in which they are most often traded.

An example:

Commodity	Cobalt
Traded forms	Cobalt min 99.3% Russian; Cobalt min 99.8% - aerospace application

Cobalt is an important export product of Russia and therefore the Russian quality is often traded. Another form of cobalt crucial to the aerospace industry is a high grade form of cobalt with 99.8% purity.

== See also ==
- Commodity market
- Copper cartels
- List of traded commodities
- Gold as an investment
- Metallurgical assay
- Scrap
- Silver as an investment
- Steel industry
