= Cordillera de Queule =

Geography
- Country: Chile
- Region(s): La Araucanía, Los Ríos
- Range coordinates: 39°22.65′S 73°4.25′W
- Parent range: Cordillera de la costa

Geology
- Orogeny: Toco
- Rock age: Carboniferous

Cordillera de Queule is a minor mountain range in the border of La Araucanía Region and Los Ríos Region, southern Chile. The forested hills of Cordillera de Queule makes up the northern boundary of Lingue Rivers drainage basin.

== See also ==
- Chilean Coast Range
- Cordillera de Nahuelbuta
- Cordillera de Mahuidanchi
