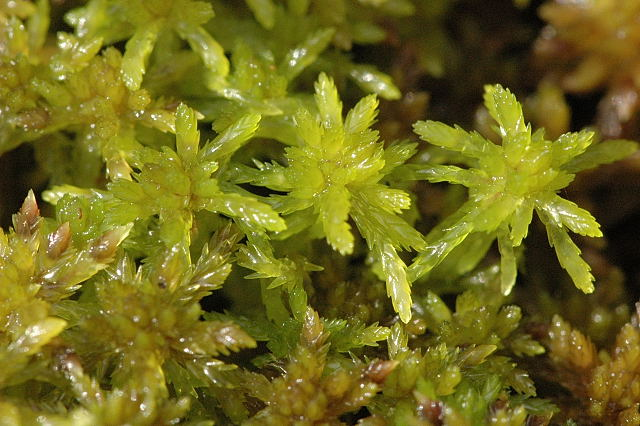
- Sphagnum flesum

Scientific classification
- Kingdom: Plantae
- Division: Bryophyta
- Class: Sphagnopsida
- Order: Sphagnales
- Family: Sphagnaceae
- Genus: Sphagnum; L.

Species
- List of Sphagnum species

Synonyms
- Isocladus Lindb.

= Sphagnum =

Genus of mosses, peat moss

Sphagnum is a genus of approximately 380 species of mosses, commonly known as sphagnum moss, also bog moss and quacker moss (although that term is also sometimes used for peat). Accumulations of Sphagnum can store water, since both living and dead plants can hold large quantities of water inside their cells; plants may hold 16 to 26 times as much water as their dry weight, depending on the species. The empty cells help retain water in drier conditions.

As Sphagnum moss grows, it can slowly spread into drier conditions, forming larger mires, both raised bogs and blanket bogs. Thus, Sphagnum can influence the composition of such habitats, with some describing Sphagnum as 'habitat manipulators' or 'autogenic ecosystem engineers'. These peat accumulations then provide habitat for a wide array of peatland plants, including sedges and ericaceous shrubs, as well as orchids and carnivorous plants.

Sphagnum and the peat formed from it do not decay readily because of the phenolic compounds embedded in the moss's cell walls. In addition, bogs, like all wetlands, develop anaerobic soil conditions, which produces slower anaerobic decay rather than aerobic microbial action. Peat moss can also acidify its surroundings by taking up cations, such as calcium and magnesium, and releasing hydrogen ions.

Under the right conditions, peat can accumulate to a depth of many meters. Different species of Sphagnum have different tolerance limits for flooding and pH, and any one peatland may have a number of different Sphagnum species.

== Description ==
An individual Sphagnum plant consists of a main stem, with tightly arranged clusters of branch fascicles usually consisting of two or three spreading branches and two to four hanging branches. The top of the plant (capitulum) has compact clusters of young branches that give the plant its characteristic tuft-like appearance. Along the stem are scattered leaves of various shapes, named stem leaves; the shape varies according to species.

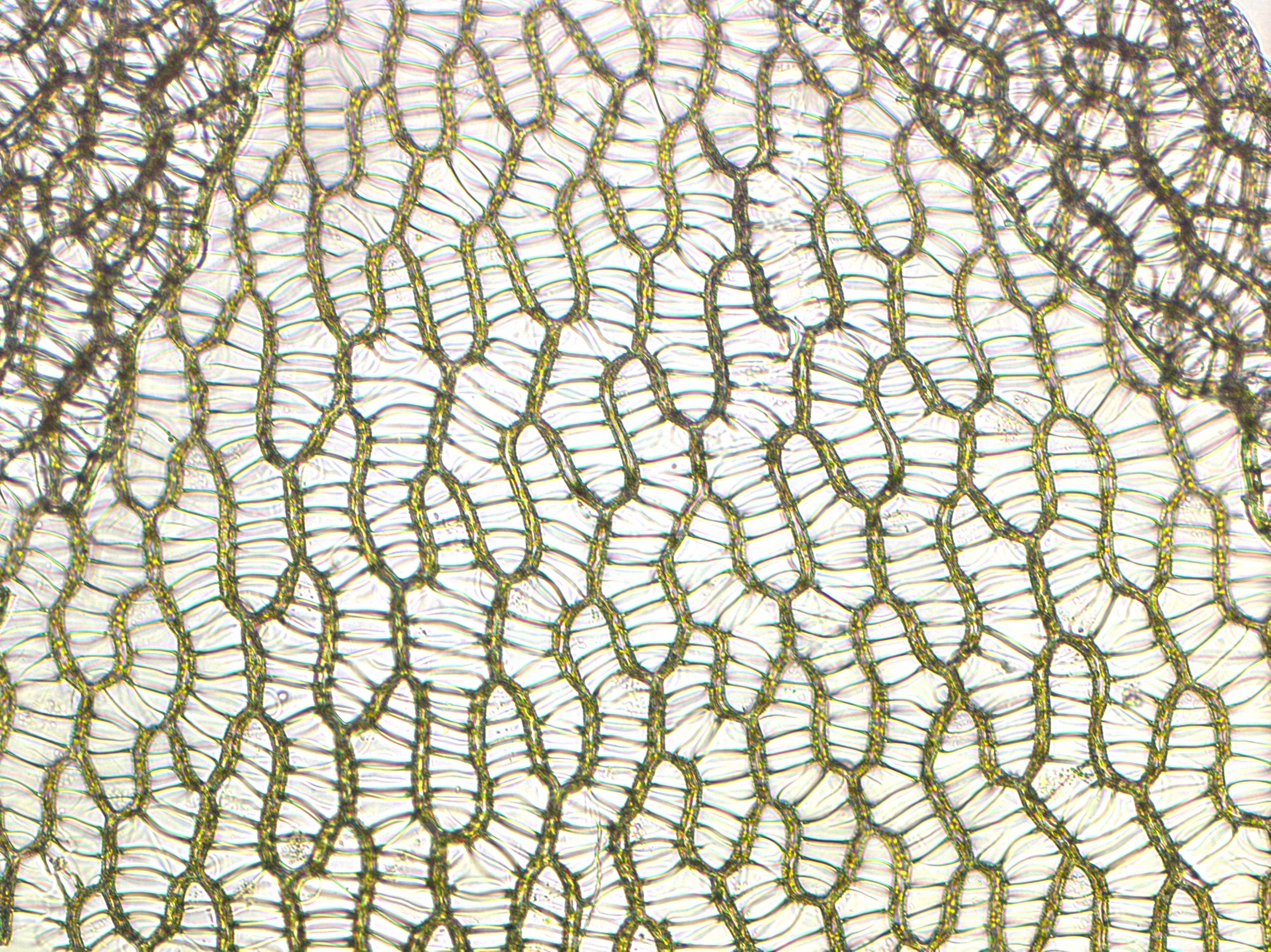
Sphagnum cells

Sphagnum has a distinctive cellular structure. The stem portion consists of two important sections: the pith which is the site of food production and storage, and the cortical layer which serves to absorb water and protect the pith. Mosses have no vascular system to move water and nutrients around the plant. Thus tissues are thin and usually one cell thick to allow them to diffuse easily. Sphagnum mosses have two distinct cell types. There are small, green, living cells with chlorophyll (chlorophyllose cells) that produce food for the plant. Additionally, there are larger hyaline or retort cells that are barrel shaped and have a pore at one end to allow for water absorption and improved water-holding capacity. These unique cells help Sphagnum to retain water during prolonged UV exposure.

=== Lifecycle ===
Sphagnum, like all other land plants, has an alternation of generations; like other bryophytes, the haploid gametophyte generation is dominant and persistent. Unlike other mosses, the long-lived gametophytes do not rely upon rhizoids to assist in water uptake.

Sphagnum species can be unisexual (male or female, dioecious) or bisexual (male and female gametes produced from the same plant; monoecious); In North America, 80% of Sphagnum species are unisexual.

Gametophytes have substantial asexual reproduction by fragmentation, producing much of the living material in sphagnum peatlands.

Swimming sperm fertilize eggs contained in archegonia that remain attached to the female gametophyte. The sporophyte is relatively short-lived, and consists almost entirely of a shiny green, spherical spore capsule that becomes black with spores. Sporophytes are raised on stalks to facilitate spore dispersal, but unlike other mosses, Sphagnum stalks are produced by the maternal gametophyte. Tetrahedral haploid spores are produced in the sporophyte by meiosis, which are then dispersed when the capsule explosively discharges its cap, called an operculum, and shoots the spores some distance. The spores germinate to produce minute protonemae, which start as filaments, can become thalloid, and can produce a few rhizoids. Soon afterwards, the protonema develops buds and these differentiate into its characteristic, erect, leafy, branched gametophyte with chlorophyllose cells and hyaline cells.

Carpets of living Sphagnum may be attacked by various fungi, and one fungus that is also a mushroom, Sphagnurus paluster, produces conspicuous dead patches. When this fungus and other agarics attack the protonema, Sphagnum is induced to produce nonphotosynthetic gemmae that can survive the fungal attack and months later germinate to produce new protonema and leafy gametophytes.

=== Spore dispersal ===
As with many other mosses, Sphagnum species disperse spores through the wind. The tops of spore capsules are only about 1 cm (1/2") above ground, and where wind is weak. As the spherical spore capsule dries, the operculum is forced off, followed by a cloud of spores. The exact mechanism has traditionally attributed to a "pop gun" method using air compressed in the capsule, reaching a maximum velocity of 3.6 meters (12 feet) per second, but alternative mechanisms have been recently proposed. High-speed photography has shown vortex rings are created during the discharge, which enable the spores to reach a height of 10 to 20 cm (4 to 8 in), further than would be expected by ballistics alone. The acceleration of the spores is about 36,000g. Spores are extremely important in establishment of new populations in disturbed habitats and on islands.

Human activities like slash-and-burn and cattle grazing are believed to promote the growth and expansion of Sphagnum moss. Oceanic islands such as the Faroe Islands, the Galápagos or the Azores have recorded a significant increase in their Sphagnum populations after human settlement.

== Taxonomy ==
Peat moss can be distinguished from other moss species by its unique branch clusters. The plant and stem color, the shape of the branch and stem leaves, and the shape of the green cells are all characteristics used to identify peat moss to species. Sphagnum taxonomy has been very contentious since the early 1900s; most species require microscopic dissection to be identified. In the field, most Sphagnum species can be identified to one of four major sections of the genus—classification and descriptions follow Andrus 2007 (Flora North America):

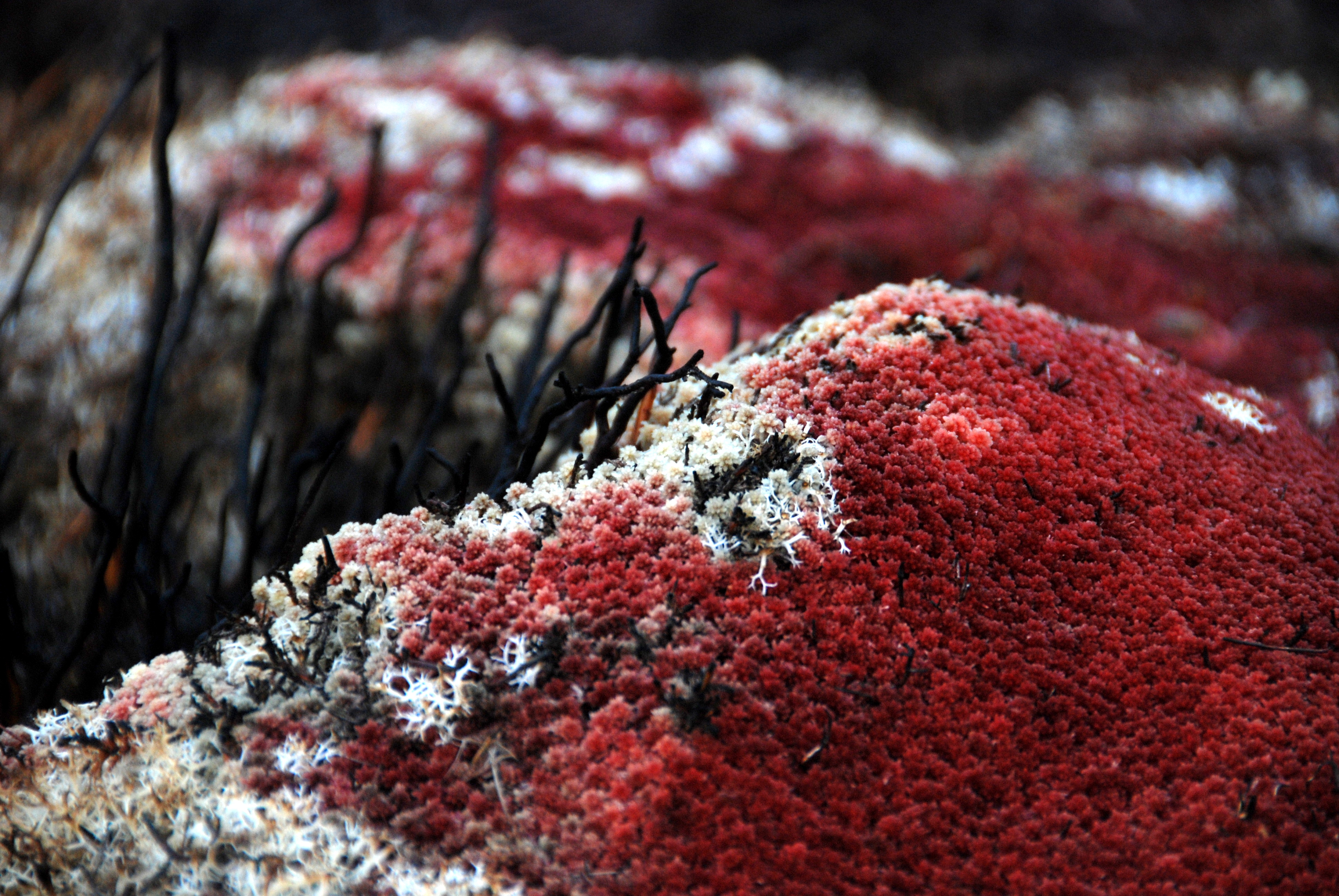
Red sphagnum closeup

- Sphagnum sect. Acutifolia plants generally form hummocks above the water line, usually colored orange or red. Examples: Sphagnum fuscum and S. warnstorfii.
- Sphagnum sect. Cuspidata plants are usually found in hollows, lawns, or are aquatic, and are green. Examples: Sphagnum cuspidatum and S. flexuosum.
- Sphagnum sect. Sphagnum plants have the largest gametophytes among the sections, forming large hummocks, their leaves form cucullate (hood-shaped) apices, and are green, except for S. magellanicum Example: Sphagnum austinii.
- Sphagnum sect. Subsecunda plants vary in color from green to yellow and orange (but never red), and are found in hollows, lawns, or are aquatic. Species always with unisexual gametophytes. Examples: Sphagnum lescurii and Sphagnum pylaesii.

The reciprocal monophyly of these sections and two other minor ones (Rigida and Squarrosa) has been clarified using molecular phylogenetics. All but two species normally identified as Sphagnum reside in one clade; two other species have recently been separated into new families within the Sphagnales reflecting an ancestral relationship with the Tasmanian endemic Ambuchanania and long phylogenetic distance to the rest of Sphagnum. Within main clade of Sphagnum, phylogenetic distance is relatively short, and molecular dating methods suggest nearly all current Sphagnum species are descended from a radiation that occurred just 14 million years ago.

== Distribution ==
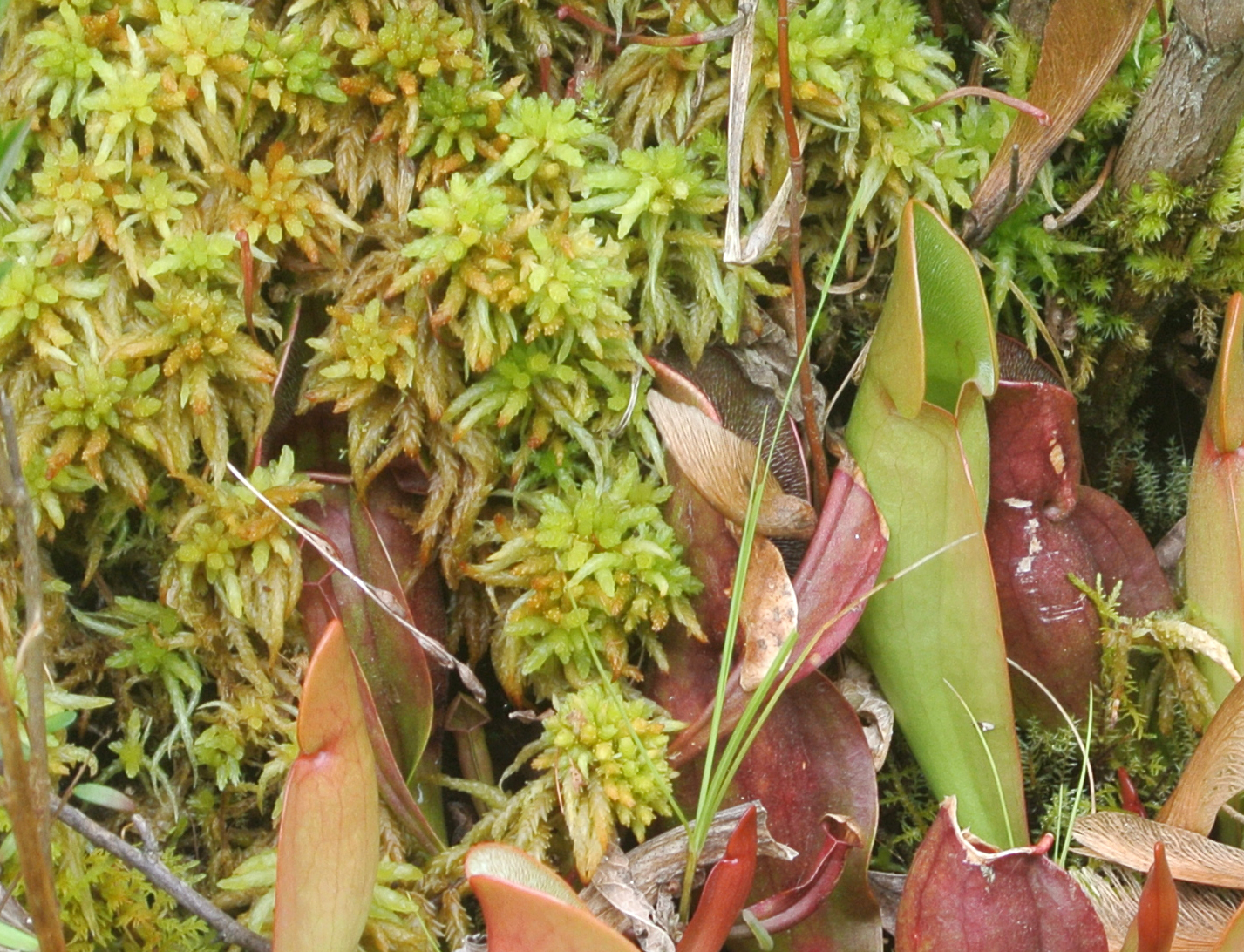
Sphagnum with northern pitcher plants (Sarracenia purpurea) at Brown's Lake Bog, Ohio

Sphagnum mosses occur mainly in the Northern Hemisphere in peat bogs, conifer forests, and moist tundra areas. Their northernmost populations lie in the archipelago of Svalbard, Arctic Norway, at 81° N.

In the Southern Hemisphere, the largest peat areas are in southern Chile and Argentina, part of the vast Magellanic moorland (circa 44,000 square km; 17,000 sq. mi). Peat areas are also found in New Zealand and Tasmania. In the Southern Hemisphere, however, peat landscapes may contain many moss species other than Sphagnum. Sphagnum species are also reported from "dripping rocks" in mountainous, subtropical Brazil.

== Conservation ==
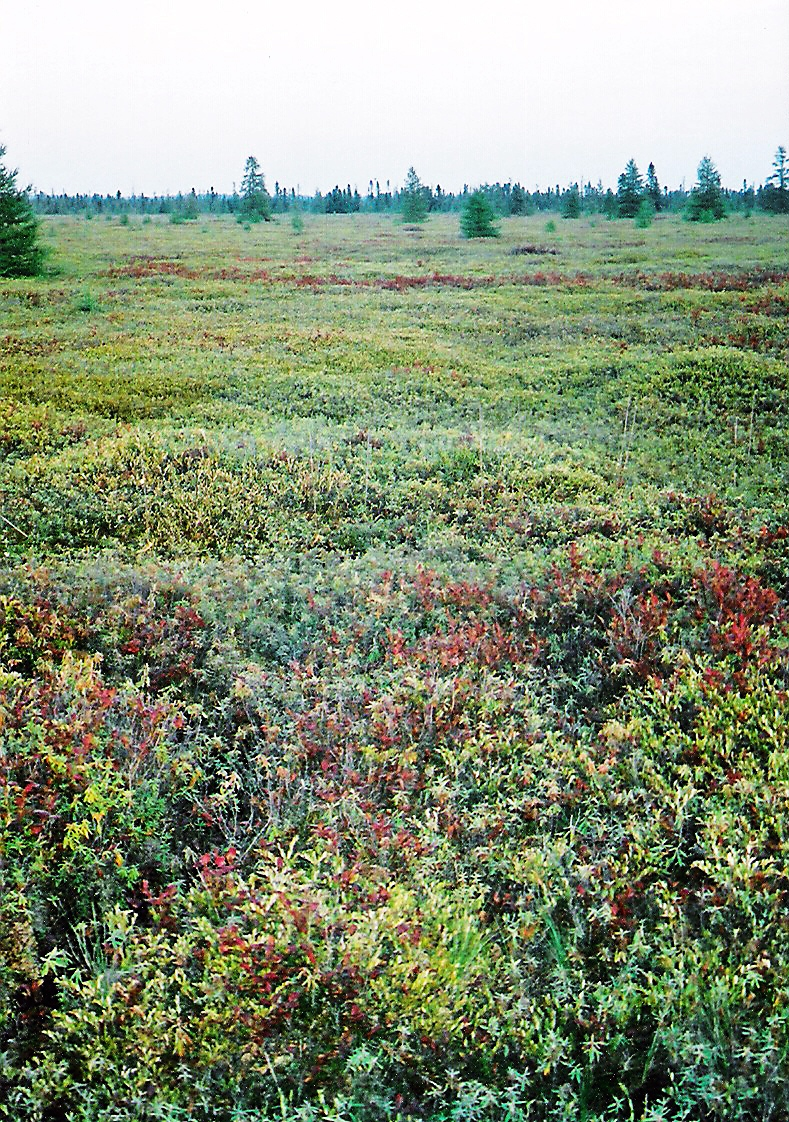
Mer Bleue Bog, a large, protected Sphagnum bog near Ottawa, Ontario, Canada

Several of the world's largest wetlands are sphagnum-dominated bogs, including the West Siberian Lowland, the Hudson Bay Lowland and the Mackenzie River Valley. These areas provide habitat for common and rare species. They also store large amounts of carbon, which helps reduce global warming.

According to an article written in 2013, the U.S. got up to 80% of sphagnum peat moss it uses from Canada. At that time, in Canada, the peat bog mass harvested each year was roughly 1/60th of the peat mass that annually accumulated. About 0.02% of the 1.1 million km^{2} (420,000 sq mi) of Canadian peat bog are used for peat moss mining. Some efforts are being made to restore peat bogs after peat mining, and some debate exists as to whether the peat bogs can be restored to their premining condition and how long the process takes. "The North American Wetlands Conservation Council estimates that harvested peatlands can be restored to 'ecologically balanced systems' within five to 20 years after peat harvesting." Some wetlands scientists assert that "a managed bog bears little resemblance to a natural one. Like tree farms, these peatlands tend toward monoculture, lacking the biodiversity of an unharvested bog."

PittMoss, a peat moss alternative made from recycled newspaper, has emerged as a sustainable substitute in growing media. Coir has also been touted as a sustainable alternative to peat moss in growing media. Another peat moss alternative is manufactured in California from sustainably harvested redwood fiber. Semi-open cell polyurethane materials available in flaked and sheet stock are also finding application as sphagnum replacements with typical usage in green wall and roof garden substrates.

=== Chile ===
In the 2010s, Sphagnum peat in Chile began to be harvested at a large scale for export to countries like Japan, South Korea, Taiwan and the United States. Sphagnum’s ability to absorb excess water and release it during dry months means that overexploitation may threaten the water supply in the fjords and channels of Chile. Extraction of Sphagnum in Chile has been regulated by law since 2 August 2018. Between 2018 and 2024, Chilean law allowed for the manual extraction of Sphagnum using only pitchforks or similar tools as an aid. In a given designated harvesting area (polygon) at least 30% of Sphagnum coverage had to be left unharvested. Harvested Sphagnum fibers were not allowed to exceed 15 cm (5.9 in) in length and the remaining Sphagnum after harvest was not to be left with a length of less than 5 cm (2.0 in) over the water table. In the regions of Los Ríos (40°S) and Los Lagos (41–43°S) the same plots could be harvested after 12 years, while further south in Aysén (44–48°S) and Magallanes (49–56°S) 85 years had to pass before the same area can be harvested again.

According to a 2024 law harvesting of Sphagnum can only be done with land-management plans approved by Servicio Agrícola y Ganadero. Some environmental organisations expressed regret as the original law project presented in 2018 sought the extablish a definitive ban on the harvest. Along Rubens River in Magallanes Region there are some historically important harvesting fields of peat in Sphagnum peatlands. Sphagnum peatlands in Chile disturbed by peat extraction have been found to host various invasive plant species including Rumex acetosella, Carex canescens, Holcus lanatus and Hieracium pilosella. Harvesting of peat in Sphagnum mosses or any where else is forbidden in Chile since April 2024.

Harvesting aside, bogs where Sphagnum grows have also come under threat by the development of wind farms in cool humid areas such as the Cordillera del Piuchén where the San Pedro Wind Farm was constructed in the 2010s. The construction of each wind turbine usually implies the removal of vegetation and the alteration of the soil, changing the local hydrology.

=== Europe ===
Europe has a long history of the exploitation of peatlands. The Netherlands, for example, once had large areas of peatland, both fen and bog. Between 100 AD and the present, they were drained and converted to agricultural land. The English broadlands have small lakes that originated as peat mines. More than 90% of the bogs in England have been damaged or destroyed. A handful of bogs has been preserved through government buyouts of peat-mining interests. Over longer time scales, however, some parts of England, Ireland, Scotland, and Wales have seen expansion of bogs, particularly blanket bogs, in response to deforestation and abandonment of agricultural land.

=== New Zealand ===
New Zealand has, like other parts of the world, lost large areas of peatland. The latest estimates for wetland loss in New Zealand are 90% over 150 years. In some cases, better care is taken during the harvesting of Sphagnum to ensure enough moss is remaining to allow regrowth. An 8-year cycle is suggested, but some sites require a longer cycle of 11 to 32 years for full recovery of biomass, depending on factors including whether reseeding is done, the light intensity, and the water table.

== Uses ==
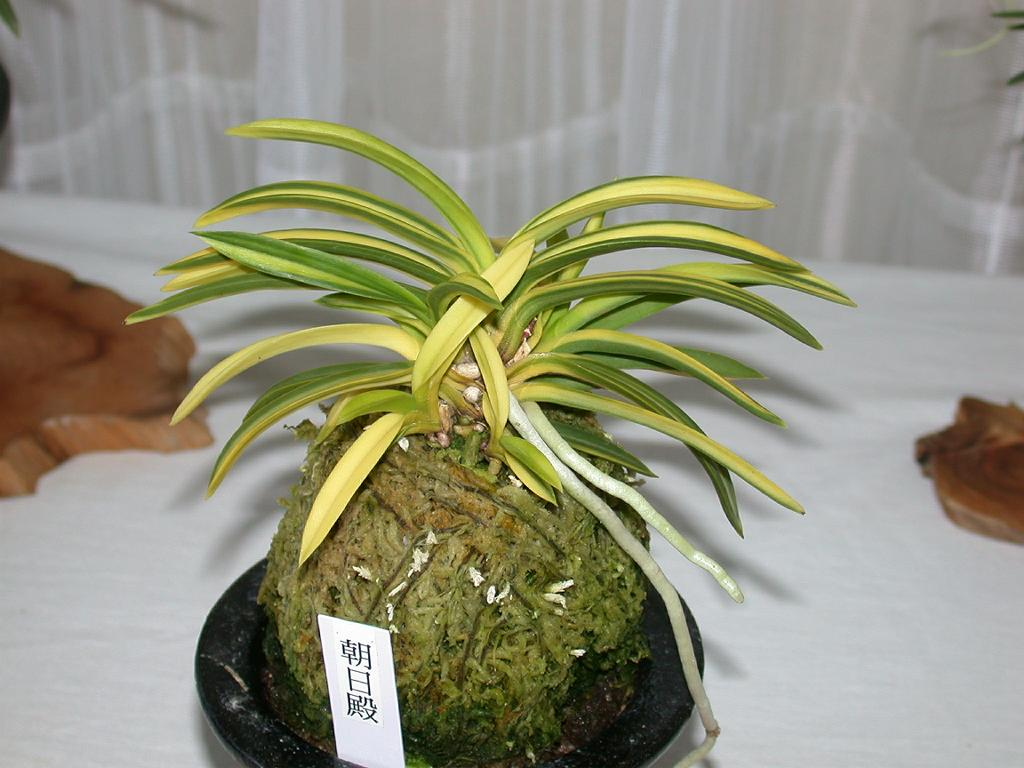
Long strand Sphagnum moss used in mounting a Vanda Falcata orchid

Decayed and dried sphagnum moss is referred to as peat or peat moss. This is used as a soil conditioner which increases the soil's capacity to hold water and nutrients by increasing capillary forces and cation exchange capacity: uses that are particularly useful in gardening. This is often desired when dealing with very sandy soil, or plants that need increased or steady moisture content to flourish. A distinction is sometimes made between sphagnum moss, the live moss growing on top of a peat bog, and 'sphagnum peat moss' (North American usage) or 'sphagnum peat' (British usage), the latter being the slowly decaying matter underneath.

Anaerobic acidic sphagnum bogs have low rates of decay, and hence preserve plant fragments and pollen to allow reconstruction of past environments. They even preserve human bodies for millennia; examples of these preserved specimens are Tollund Man, Haraldskær Woman, Clonycavan Man and Lindow Man. Such bogs can also preserve human hair and clothing, one of the most noteworthy examples being Egtved Girl, Denmark. Because of the acidity of peat, however, bones are dissolved rather than preserved. These bogs have also been used to preserve food. Up to 2000-year-old containers of butter or lard have been found.

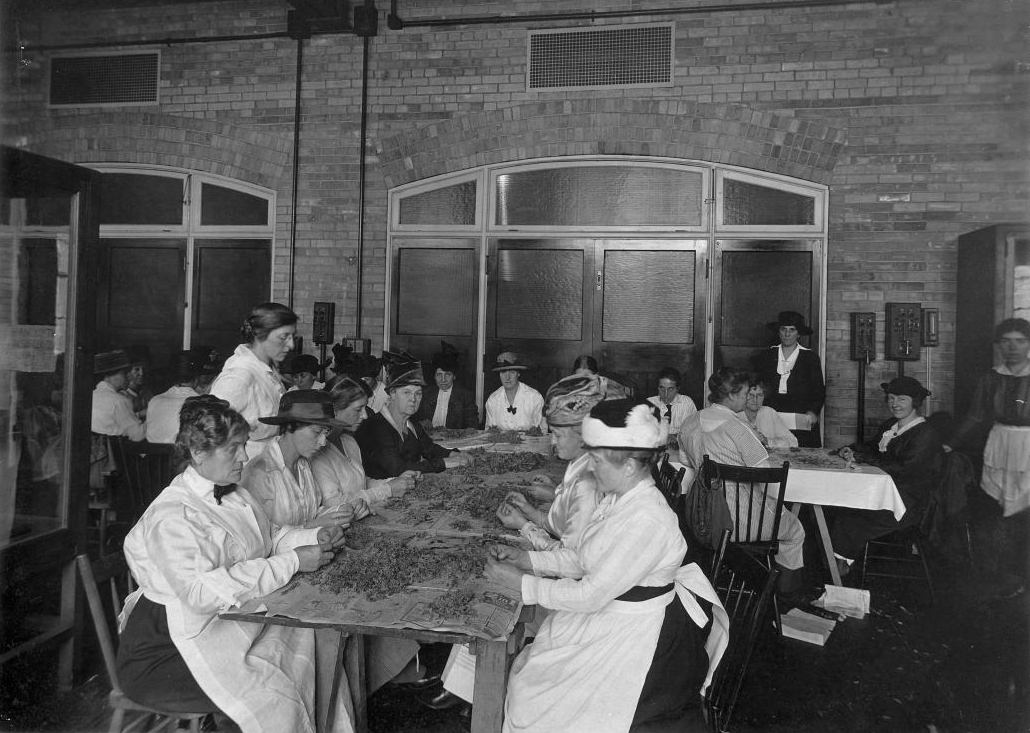
Sphagnum moss wound dressings being made at the University of Toronto c. 1914

Sphagnum moss has been used for centuries as a dressing for wounds, including through World War I. Botanist John William Hotson's paper, "Sphagnum as a surgical dressing", published in Science in 1918, was instrumental in the acceptance of Sphagnum moss use as a medical dressing in place of cotton. Preparations using Sphagnum such as Sphagnol soap have been used for various skin conditions including acne, ringworm, and eczema. The soap was used by the British Red Cross during both World Wars to treat facial wounds and trench sores.

Sphagnum moss is used as a substrate in reptile terrariums because it supports humidity and provides a soft base for burrowing or nesting.

Peat moss is used to dispose of the clarified liquid output (effluent) from septic tanks in areas that lack the proper conditions for ordinary disposal means. It is also used as an environmentally friendly alternative to chlorine in swimming pool sanitation. The moss inhibits the growth of microbes and reduces the need for chlorine in swimming pools.

In Finland, peat mosses have been used to make bread during famines.

In China, Japan and Korea, long strand dried sphagnum moss is traditionally used as a potting medium for cultivating Vanda falcata orchids.
