= List of longest mountain chains on Earth =

The world's longest above-water mountain range is the Andes, about 7,000 km (4,300 mi) long. The range stretches from north to south through seven countries in South America, along the west coast of the continent: Venezuela, Colombia, Ecuador, Peru, Bolivia, Chile, and Argentina. Aconcagua is the highest peak, at about 6,962 m (22,841 ft), as well as the highest mountain outside of Asia.

This list does not include submarine mountain ranges. If submarine mountains are included, the longest is the global mid-ocean ridge system which extends for about 65,000 km (40,000 mi).

== Formation ==
Mountain chains are typically formed by the process of plate tectonics. Tectonic plates slide very slowly over the Earth's mantle, a lower place of rock that is heated from the Earth's interior. Several huge sections of the Earth's crust are impelled by heat currents in the mantle, producing tremendous forces that can buckle the material at the edges of the plates to form mountains. Usually one plate is forced underneath the other, and the lower plate is slowly absorbed by the mantle. Where the two plates pass one another, heated rock from the mantle can burst through the crust to form volcanoes. The movement of the plates against one another can also cause earthquakes.

== List ==
Rank	Range	Continent	Country	Coordinates	Approx. length	Approx. width	Max. elevation	Highest point
1	Andes	South America	Argentina; Bolivia; Chile; Colombia; Ecuador; Peru; Venezuela	32°S 70°W	7,000 km (4,300 mi)	500 km (310 mi)	6,962 m (22,841 ft)	Mount Aconcagua
2	Southern Great Escarpment	Africa	Zimbabwe; South Africa; Eswatini; Lesotho; Namibia; Angola	29°S 29°E	5,000 km (3,100 mi)	300 km (200 mi)	3,482 m (11,424 ft)	Mafadi
3	Rocky Mountains	North America	Canada; United States	39°N 106°W	4,800 km (3,000 mi)	300 km (200 mi)	4,401 m (14,439 ft)	Mount Elbert
4	Transantarctic Mountains	Antarctica	Antarctica	84°S 166°E	3,500 km (2,200 mi)	400 km (250 mi)	4,528 m (14,856 ft)	Mount Kirkpatrick
5	Great Dividing Range	Australia	Australia	36°S 148°E	3,500 km (2,200 mi)	300 km (190 mi)	2,228 m (7,310 ft)	Mount Kosciuszko
6	Appalachian Mountains	North America	Canada; United States	36°N 81°W	3,200 km (2,000 mi)	70 km (43 mi)	2,037 m (6,684 ft)	Mount Mitchell
7	Chilean Coast Range	South America	Chile	24°S 70°W	3,100 km (1,900 mi)	70 km (43 mi)	3,114 m (10,217 ft)	Cerro Vicuña Mackenna
8	Himalayas	Asia	India; Pakistan; China; Bhutan; Nepal; Afghanistan; Myanmar	27°N 86°E	2,600 km (1,600 mi)	350 km (220 mi)	8,848 m (29,029 ft)	Mount Everest
9	Ural Mountains	Asia and Europe	Russia; Kazakhstan	60°N 60°E	2,500 km (1,600 mi)	150 km (93 mi)	1,895 m (6,217 ft)	Mount Narodnaya
10	Atlas Mountains	Africa	Morocco; Algeria; Tunisia	31°N 7°W	2,500 km (1,600 mi)	113km (70 mi)	4,167 m (13,671 ft)	Djebel Toubkal

== See also ==
- List of mountain ranges
- Lists of mountains
- Continent
