= Cordillera de Pirulil =

Mountain range in Chiloé Island, Chile

Coordinates: 42°50′S 74°01′W

Pirulil Range
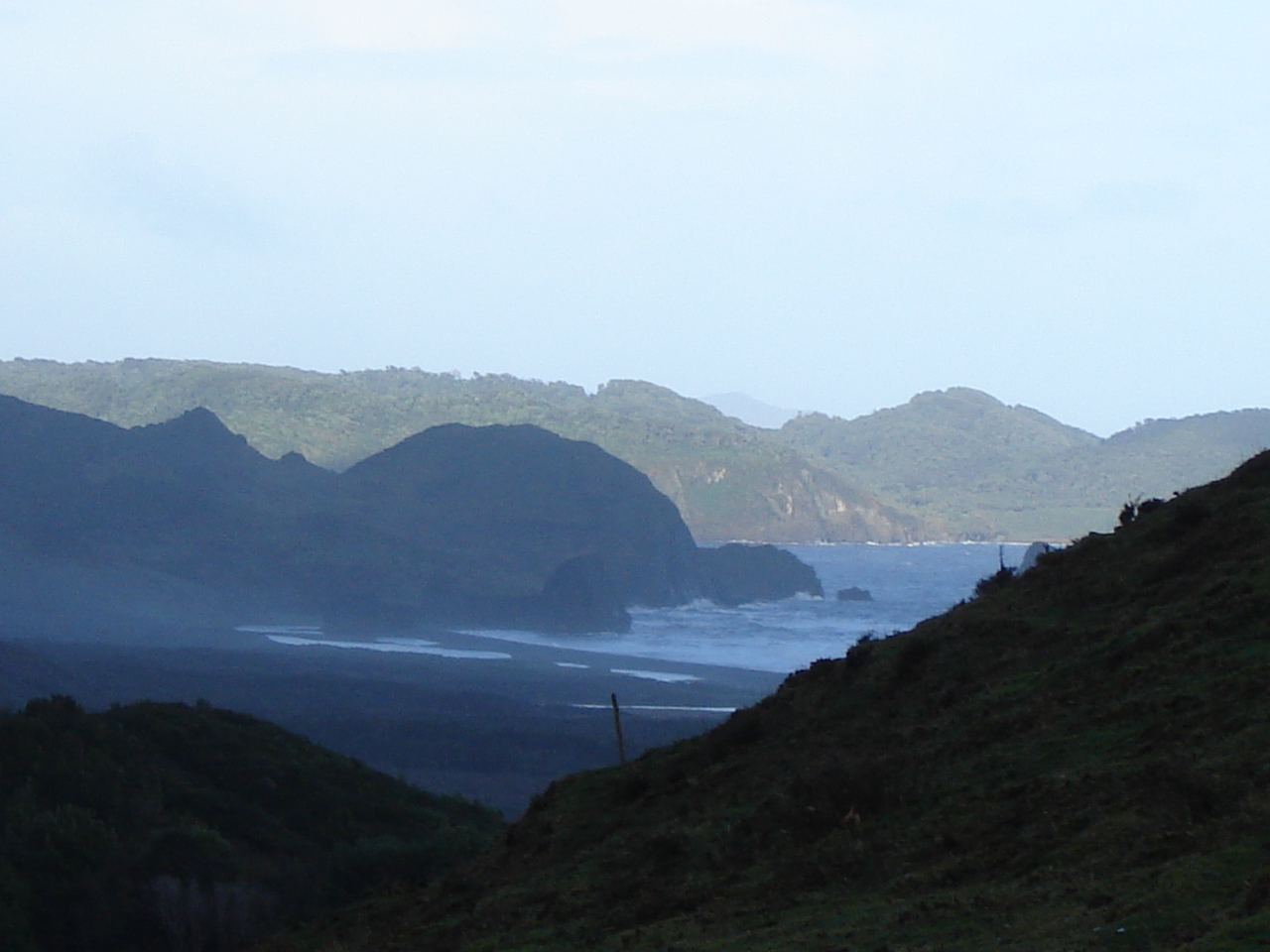
- Hilly terrain at the southern shores of Chiloé Island

Geography
- Country: Chile
- Region: Chiloé Province
- Parent range: Cordillera de la Costa

The Pirulil Range is a mountain range located in the southern half of Chiloé Island. It is located along the Pacific coast and forms part of the larger Chilean Coast Range. Its northern boundary is Cucao Lake, beyond which Cordillera del Piuchén rises. To the south the range ends at the Gulf of Corcovado.

It has a population of the conifer Pilgerodendron uviferum.

== See also ==
- Cordillera de Nahuelbuta
- Valdivian Coastal Range
- Pelada Range
