= Nahuelbuta National Park =

National park in Chile

- IUCN category II (national park)
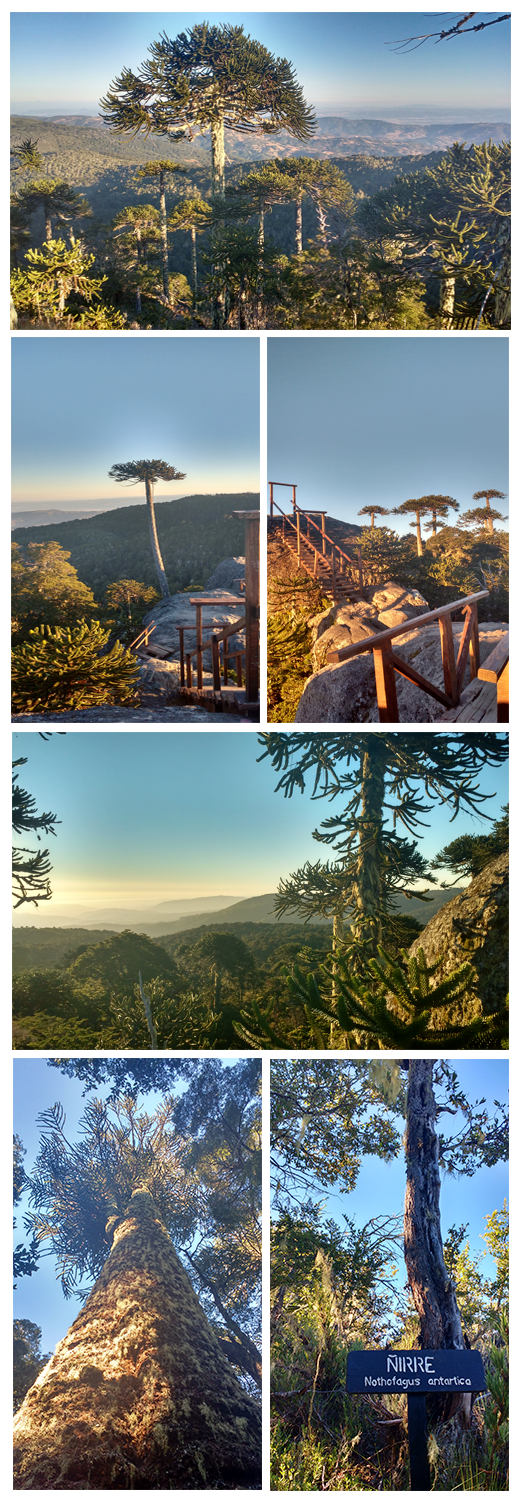
- From the top down and in the left-right direction: View from the Piedra del Águila lookout towards the east, View of an Araucaria araucana at the Piedra del Águila viewpoint, View towards the Piedra del Águila viewpoint, Araucarias at the Piedra del Aguila viewpoint, Trunk of an Araucaria araucana, Ñirre (Nothofagus antarctica) in the park.
- Interactive map of Nahuelbuta National Park
- Location: La Araucanía Region, ChileChile
- Nearest city: Angol
- Coordinates: 37°47′00″S 72°59′00″W
- Area: 68 km^{2} (26 sq mi)
- Established: 1939
- Governing body: Corporación Nacional Forestal

Nahuelbuta National Park (Spanish pronunciation: [nawelˈβuta]) is one of the few parks in La Araucanía Region of Chile's Coastal Mountain Range. It sits atop the highest part of the Cordillera de Nahuelbuta. Created in 1939, it consists of 6,832 hectares situated just 162 km northeast of Temuco. Nahuelbuta (Mapuche for "big tiger") is a sanctuary for monkey puzzle trees, with specimens dating back 2,000 years.

== Flora ==
In addition to monkey puzzle trees, the park is also home to coigüe, ñirre, roble, lenga, orchids, carnivorous plants.

== Fauna ==
The park provides habitat for the mountain lion, the pudú, a small Chilean deer, and Darwin's fox. Among the birds are the Magellanic woodpecker, the Andean tapaculo and the chucao tapaculo.

== Destinations ==
The park features 30 roads and 15 trails that can be explored by car or foot. The National Forest Corporation (Chile) information center and camping area are both found in Pehuenco, where the most popular route begins, ending at Cerro Piedra del Águila (1,379 meters). Other peaks include Cerro Anay and Alto Nahuelbuta, part of the Cordillera de Nahuelbuta. The administration of the park is located in Pehuenco, which is about 42 km from Angol. There are 10 camping sites here, with picnic tables, fire areas, rustic toilets and water. It is open to the public all year round.
