= Lingue =

Lingue may refer to:

- Lingue River
- Persea lingue, a tree.

== See also ==
- Linguee
- Lingui (disambiguation)
