= Las Araucarias =

Las Araucarias may refer to:

- Las Araucarias, Carahue, a hamlet in Chile
- Las Araucarias, Temuco, a hamlet in Chile

== See also ==
- Villa Pehuenia
