= Vicuña Mackenna Batholith =

- Stratigraphic range: Early Jurassic-Late Cretaceous; ~192–98 Ma
- Type: Batholith

Lithology
- Primary: Gabbro, granitoids

Location
- Coordinates: 24°21′57″S 69°02′24″W
- Region: Antofagasta Region
- Country: Chile

Type section
- Named for: Sierra Vicuña Mackenna

The Vicuña Mackenna Batholith (Spanish: Batolito Vicuña Mackenna) is a group of plutons in the Chilean Coast Range of northern Chile. The plutons of the batholith formed (cooled from magma to rock) between the Early Jurassic and the Late Cretaceous (192–98 Ma). The magmas that formed the batholith originated in Earth's mantle and have not suffered any significant crustal contamination. A group of Early Cretaceous plutons were intruded syn-tectonically on the Atacama Fault.

== Subdivision ==
Geologists Miguel Hervé and Nicolás Marinivic identify six major units. From the oldest to the youngest these are:

- Barazate Unit (192-181 Ma)
- Paranal Unit (ca. 170 Ma). This unit has the largest areal extent. It is composed of gabbronorite, gabbro, diorite, monzodiorite, monzogabbro and monzogabbronorite.
- Ventarrones Unit (149-138 Ma)
- Remiendos Unit (133-128 Ma)
- Herradura Unit (108-98 Ma)

== See also ==
- Coastal Batholith of Peru
