= Lanalhue Fault =

Northwest-striking fault in Chile

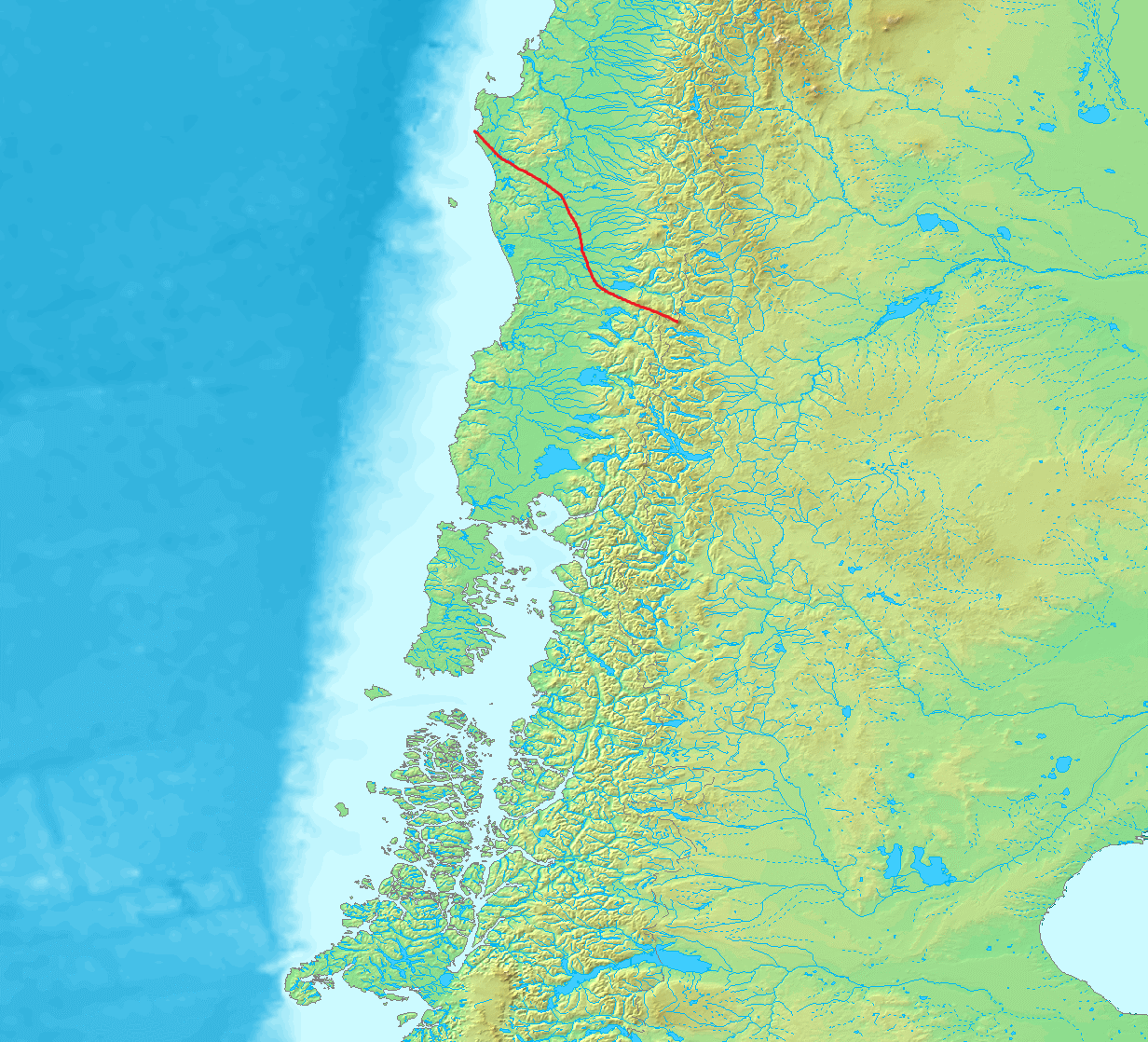
Map of the Lanalhue Fault

Lanalhue Fault is a northwest-striking fault that marks the contact between two distinct units of continental basement, the Eastern and Western Series in south-central Chile, separating the Nahuelbuta Range Cordillera de Nahuelbuta to the east and the Arauco Peninsula and Basin to the west. The fault takes its name from Lanalhue Lake, which is located in part of the fault trace – the lake's elongated shape shows the NW-SE trend. The Lanalhue Fault is a major lithological boundary in the Chilean Coast Range to which Cordillera de Nahuelbuta belongs. The Nahuelbuta Range is composed by Carboniferous granitic core bounded by high-temperature metasedimentary rocks referred as the Eastern Series. The Arauco Basin contains over 3 km of Late Cretaceous to Holocene continental and marine sediments, being a major center of coal mining and hydrocarbon exploration for over a century. From Valparaíso Region to Lanalhue Fault, Carboniferous-Permian granitoids make up a large part of the bedrock of the Chilean Coast Range. These igneous rocks were once part of a proto-Andean magmatic belt. South of Lanalhue Fault, most of the Chilean Coast Range is an accretionary wedge formed since the Paleozoic along the subduction zone at South America's western coast.

From a tentative correlation of the fault zone with the similarly NW-SE striking dextral Jurassic Gastre Fault System (cf. Rapela & Pankhurst, 1992) in Central Patagonia, Argentina, it was termed ‘Gastre Fault Zone’ or ‘Gastre-Purén Fault Zone’. However, in later works it is shown that this correlation is incorrect. It was speculated that the inferred Gastre Fault Zone aligned Villarrica, Quetrupillán and Lanín volcanoes, until the Mocha-Villarrica Fault Zone was discovered.
