= Lanalhue Lake =

Lake in Chile

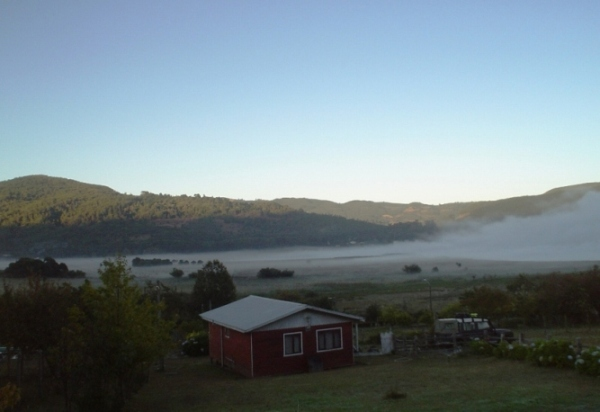

- Location within Chile

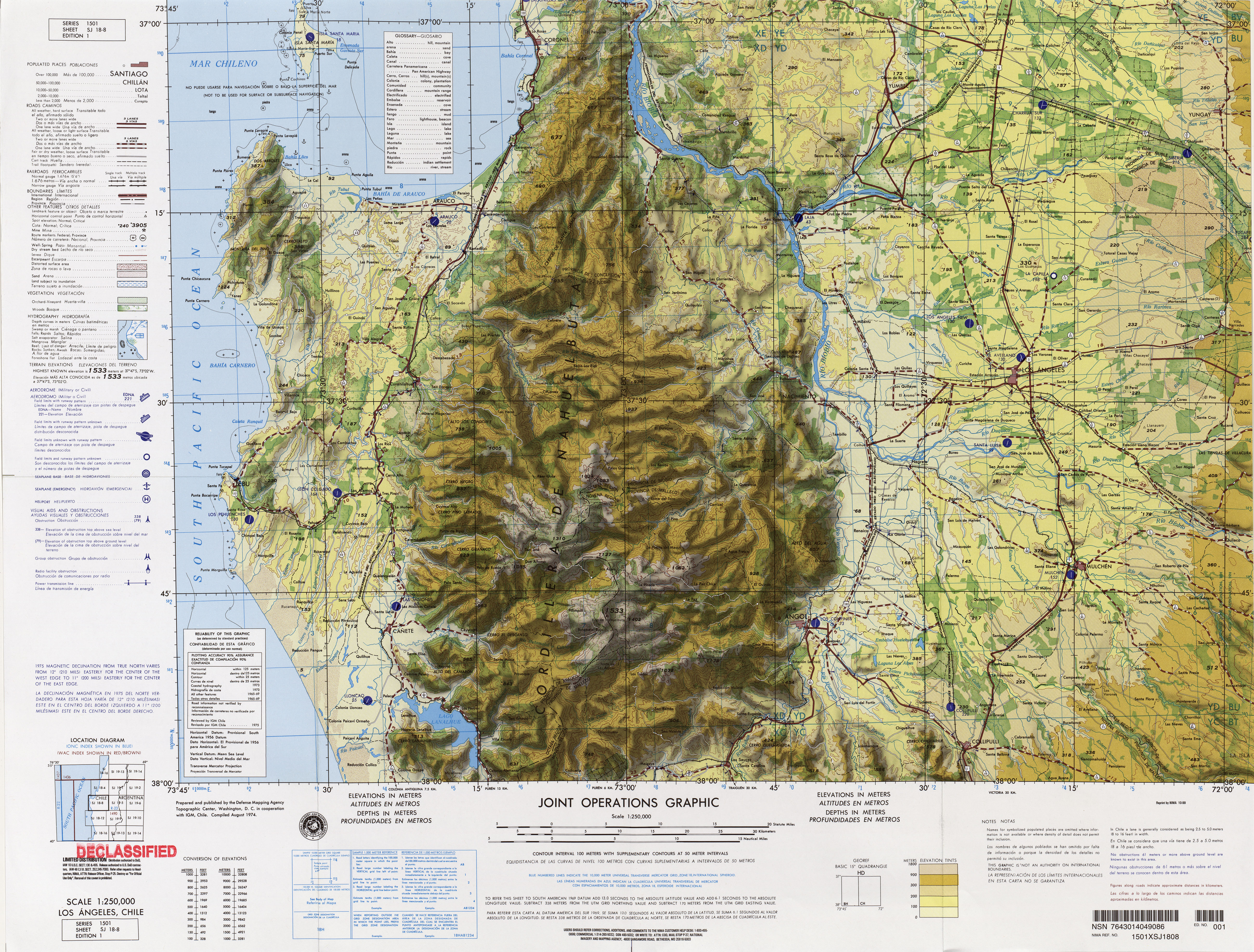
- Lago Lanalhue, left down.
- Location: Arauco Province
- Coordinates: 37°55′S 73°18′W
- Lake type: fault lake
- Catchment area: ~ 360 km^{2} (140 sq mi)
- Basin countries: Chile
- Max. length: 9 km (5.6 mi)
- Max. width: 4.3 km (2.7 mi)
- Surface area: 32.05 km^{2} (12.37 sq mi)
- Average depth: ~ 10 m (33 ft)
- Max. depth: 24 m (79 ft)
- Water volume: ~ 0.32 km^{3} (0.077 cu mi)
- Shore length^{1}: 50 km (31 mi)
- Surface elevation: 8 m (26 ft)
- ^{1} Shore length is not a well-defined measure.

Lanalhue Lake (Spanish pronunciation: [laˈnalwe]) is a Chilean lake located in the Arauco Province of Bío Bío Region. The lake is placed in the Cordillera de Nahuelbuta above the Lanalhue Fault.
