= Cerro Oncol =

Mountain in Chile

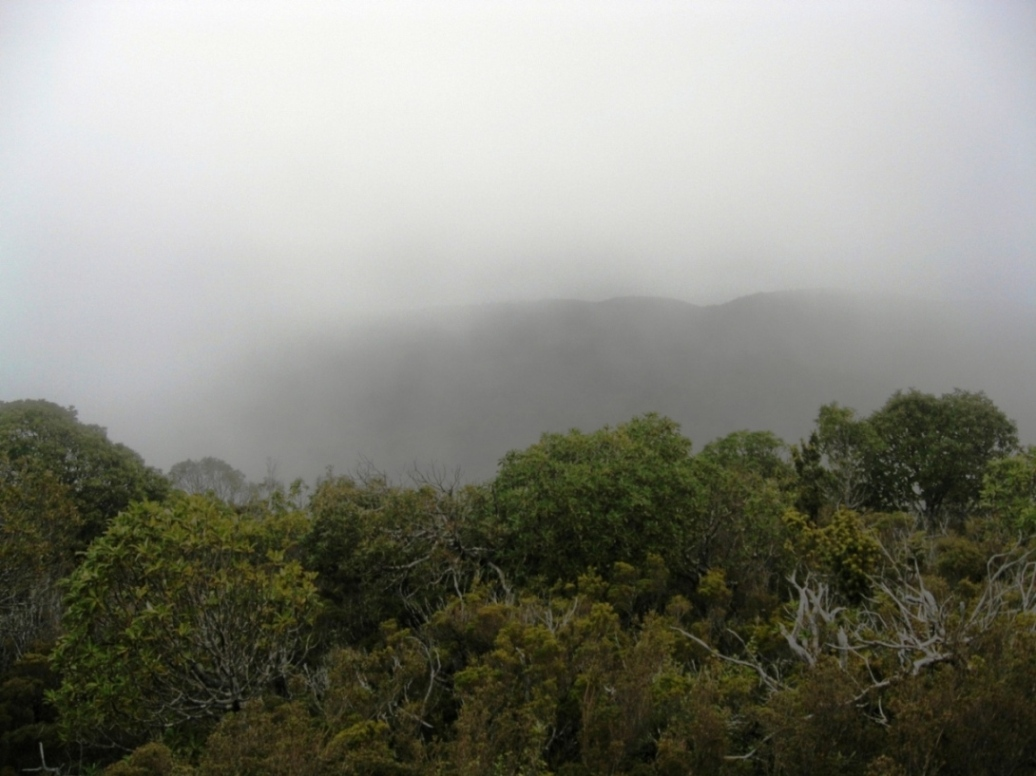
- View of the forests around Cerro Oncol

Highest point
- Elevation: 715 m (2,346 ft)
- Prominence: 715 m (2,346 ft)
- Coordinates: 39°40′S 73°17′W

Geography
- Location within Chile
- Location: Chile
- Parent range: Cordillera de Oncol

Cerro Oncol is a mountain located in the Cordillera de Oncol, Chile. At 715 m it is the highest peak of the Chilean Coast Range between the Cordillera de Nahuelbuta and Corral Bay. Cerro Oncol and its surroundings are located inside Oncol Park.
