= Sierra Vicuña Mackenna =

Cordillera Vicuña Mackenna
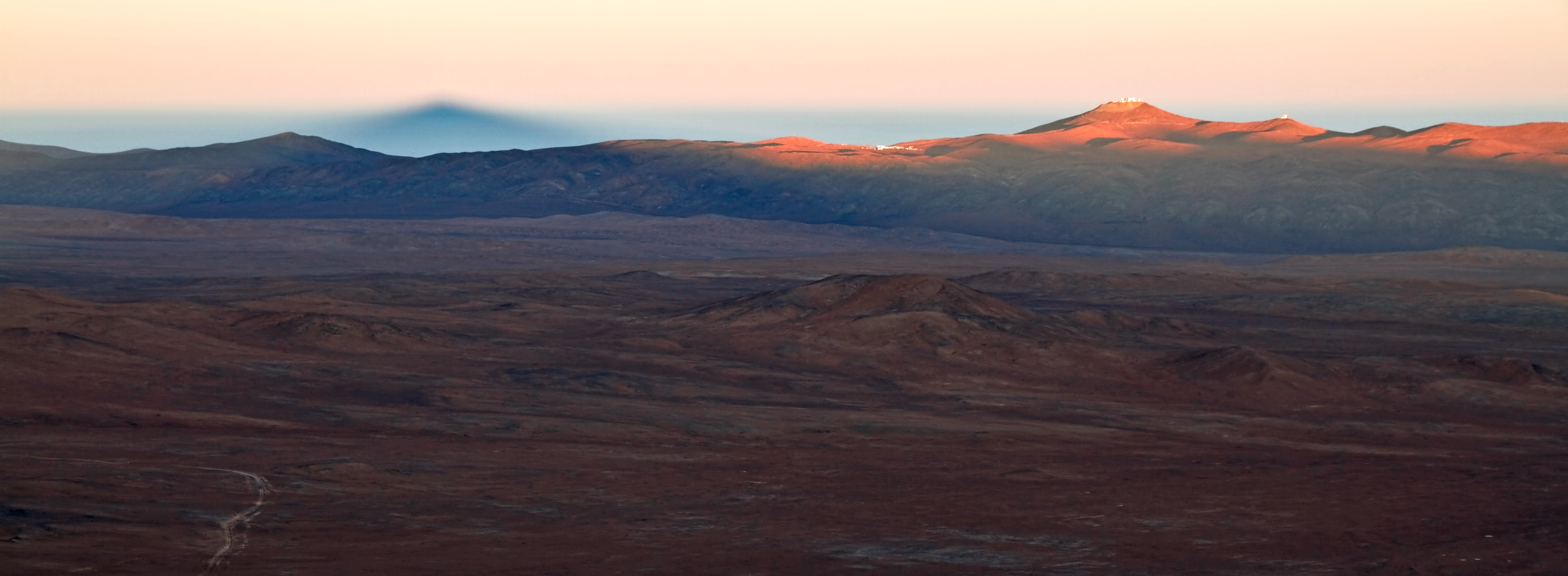
- Cerro Armazones is a mountain located in the Sierra Vicuña Mackenna.

Highest point
- Peak: Cerro Vicuña Mackenna
- Elevation: 3,114 m (10,217 ft)
- Coordinates: 24°27′S 70°03′W

Dimensions
- Length: 170 km (110 mi) north-south

Geography
- Country: Chile
- Range coordinates: 24°30′S 69°00′W
- Parent range: Chilean Coast Range

The Cordillera Vicuña Mackenna is the highest section of the Chilean Coast Range located in northern Chile, west of Pampa del Tamarugal. Its peak reaches over 3000 meters. It runs north-south for approximately 170 km parallel to the Andes. The driest parts of Atacama Desert are located east of the range due to the rain shadow produced by it.

The range is named after historian Benjamín Vicuña Mackenna.

== See also ==
- Vicuña Mackenna Batholith
