= Lingui =

Lingui may refer to:

- Lingui District, a district in China
- Lingui, The Sacred Bonds, a 2021 film
- Rally for the Republic – Lingui, a political party of Chad

== See also ==
- Linguee
- Lingue (disambiguation)
- Linguine
