= Las Araucarias, Carahue =

Coordinates: 38°29′43.2″S 73°14′12.49″W

Las Araucarias
- Interactive map of Las Araucarias
- Region: Araucanía
- Province: Cautín
- Municipalidad: Carahue
- Comuna: Carahue

Government
  - Type: Municipality
  - Alcalde: Héctor Alejandro Sáez Veliz (UDI)
- Elevation: 640 m (2,100 ft)

Population (2017)
  - Total: 66

Sex
  - Men: 38
  - Women: 28
- Time zone: UTC-4 (Chilean Standard)
  - Summer (DST): UTC-3 (Chilean Daylight)
- Area code: Country + town = 56 + 45

Las Araucarias is a hamlet (Spanish: caserío) in Araucanía Region, Chile. It is located at 640 m asl. in Cordillera de Nahuelbuta next to a small remnant of some of the southernmost Araucaria araucana trees in the Chilean Coast Range. By 1950 there were 1000 ha of Araucaria araucana forest around Las Araucarias, but by 2016 only 40 ha remained, of which 10,3 ha are protected in the Villa las Araucarias site.
