= Cucao and Huillinco =

Cucao and Huillicno Lake Lago Cucao y Huillinco
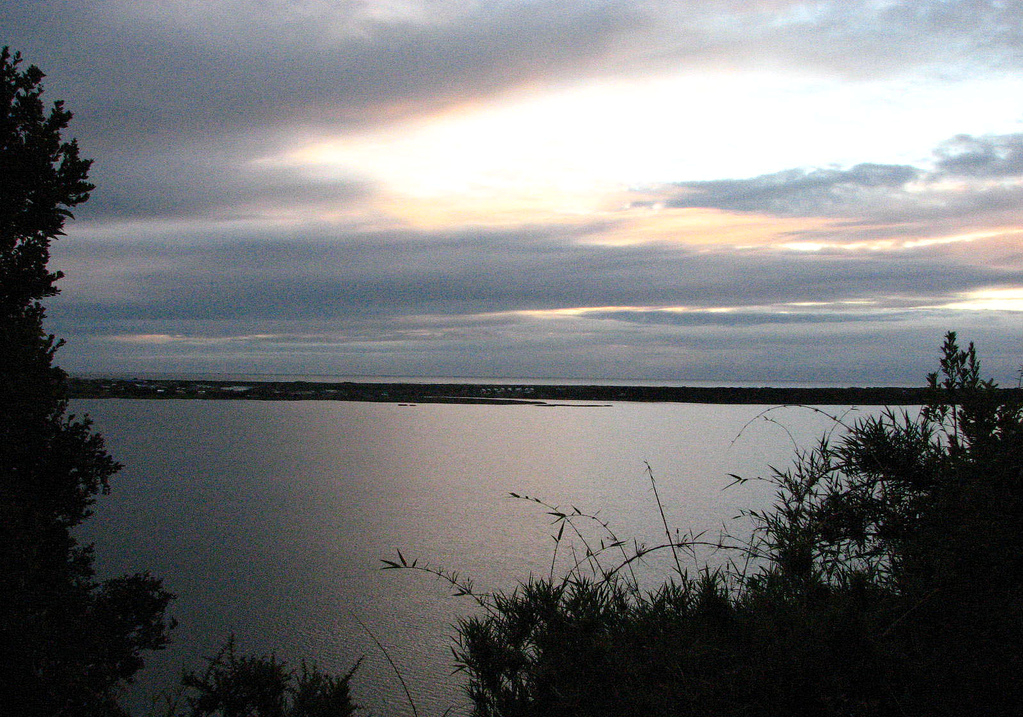
- View of Cucao Lake

- Location within Chile
- Coordinates: 42°38′20″S 74°03′59″W
- Primary outflows: Cucao River, also called Desaguadero River
- Catchment area: 32.3 km^{2} (12.5 sq mi) (Cucao)
- Basin countries: Chile
- Max. length: 7.9 km (4.9 mi) (Cucao)
- Max. width: 1.8 m (5 ft 11 in) (Cucao)
- Min. width: 0.7 m (2 ft 4 in) (Cucao)
- Surface area: 43.8 km^{2} (16.9 sq mi) (Cucao)
- Average depth: 25 m (82 ft) (Cucao)
- Max. depth: 12 km (7.5 mi) (Cucao)
- Water volume: 0.127 km^{3} (0.030 cu mi) (Cucao)
- Shore length^{1}: 22.9 km (14.2 mi) (Cucao)
- Surface elevation: 10 m (33 ft)
- ^{1} Shore length is not a well-defined measure.

Cucao and Huillinco are two lakes in central Chiloé Island, Chile, linked by a strait forming one hydrologic lake. The two lakes are oriented in west-east fashion cutting off the Chilean Coast Range in Chiloé Island into two ranges; Piuchén to north and Pirulil to the south. The outlet of the lakes, Desaguadero or Cucao River lies at the western end of Cucao Lake, and flows into the Pacific. To the west Cucao is separated from the open ocean by an ancient dune field and pastures which are crossed by Desaguadero River. The bottom of both lakes is saline.
