= Cordillera del Piuchén =

Mountain range on Chiloé Island, Chile

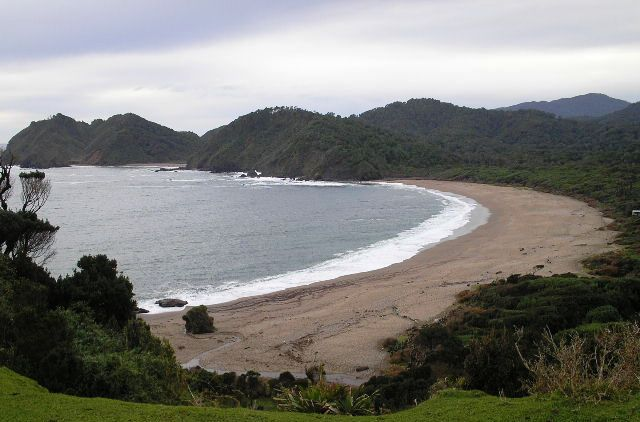

Geography
- Location within Chile
- Country: Chile
- Province: Chiloé
- Region: Los Lagos
- Parent range: Chilean Coast Range

Cordillera del Piuchén is one of the two mountain ranges located on Chiloé Island, in southern Chile. It is located along the Pacific Coast, and is part of the Chilean Coast Range System.

Its northern boundary is the Chacao Channel, while to the south it is separated from the Pirulil Range by Cucao Lake.

The vegetation in the uplands of Cordillera del Piuchén is made up of Magellanic moorland.

== See also ==
- Cordillera de Oncol
- Cordillera Pelada
- San Pedro Wind Farm
