= Magellanic moorland =

Ecoregion in Patagonia

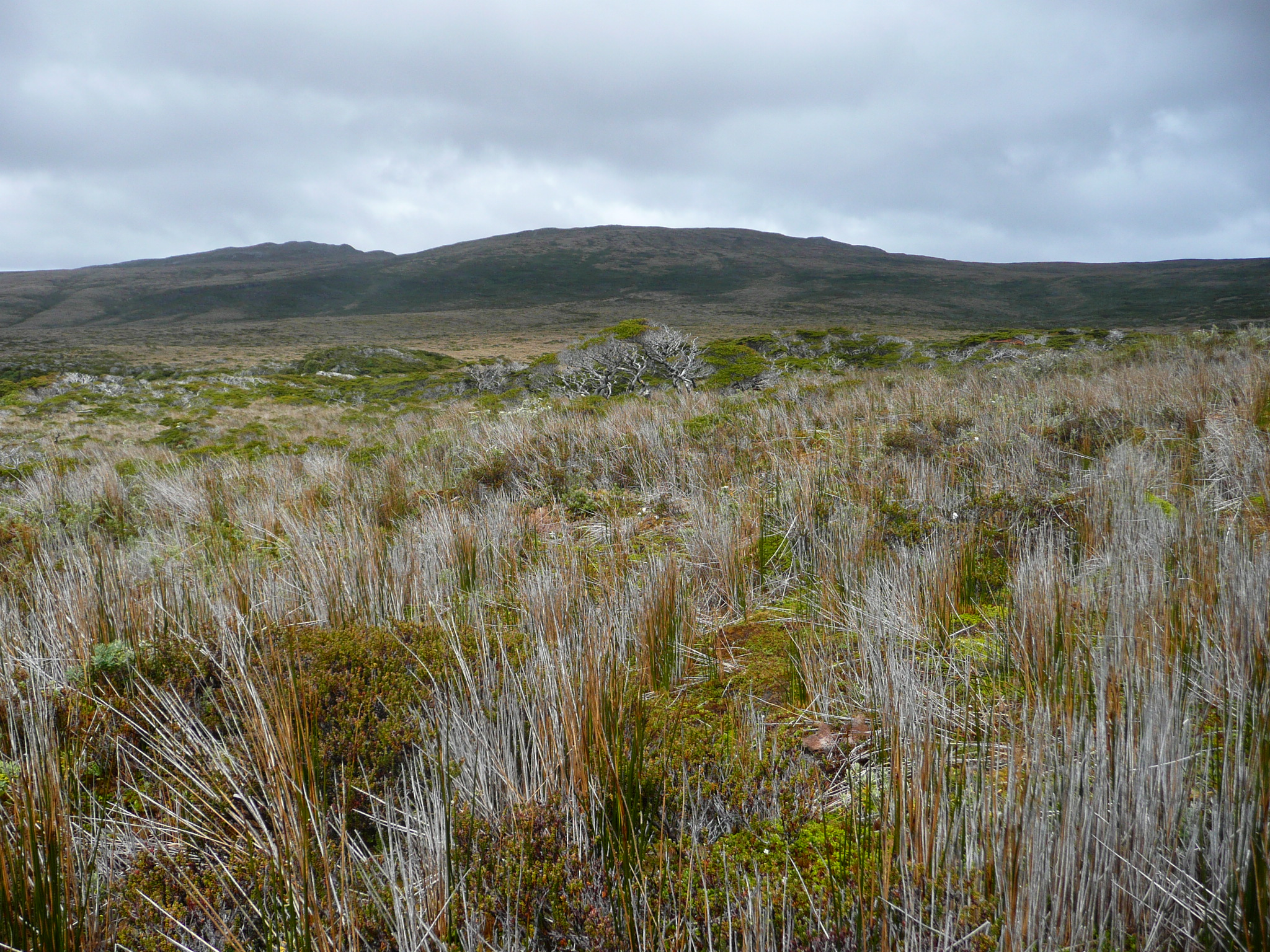
Magellanic moorland at Herschel Island, Cabo de Hornos National Park.

The Magellanic moorland or Magellanic tundra (Spanish: Tundra magallánica) is an ecoregion on the Patagonian archipelagos south of latitude 48° S. It is characterized by high rainfall with a vegetation of scrubs, bogs and patches of forest in more protected areas. Cushion plants, grass-like plants and bryophytes are common.

At present there are outliers of Magellanic moorland as far north as in the highlands of Cordillera del Piuchén (latitude 42° 22' S) in Chiloé Island. During the Llanquihue glaciation Magellanic moorland extended to the non-glaciated lowlands of Chiloé Island and further north to the lowlands of Chilean lake district (latitude 41° S).

The classification of Magellanic moorland has proven problematic as substrate, low temperatures and exposure to the ocean influences the development of the Magallanic moorland. It thus may qualify either as polar tundra or heathland.

== Flora and plant communities ==
Edmundo Pisano identifies the following plant communities for the Magellanic moorland:

1. Bogs
  1. Sphagnum bogs
    1. Magellanic sphagnum tundra
    2. Juncus bogs
  2. Non-sphagniferous bryophytic tundra
    1. Non-sphagnum moss bog
    2. Hepatica bogs
2. Pluvinar mires
  1. Hygrophytic mire tundra
  2. Montane pulvinar tundra
  3. Bryophyte and dwarf shrub tundra
3. Gramineous mires
  1. Tufty sedge tundra
  2. Subantarctic gramineous mire
4. Woody synusia tundras
  1. Tundras with Pilgerodendron uvifera
    1. Association Pilgerodendretum uviferae
      1. Sub-association Pilgerodendro-Nothofagetum betuloidis
      2. Sub-association Nano-Pilgerodendretum uviferae
  2. Interior nanophanerophytic tundras
    1. Interior heath of low to medium elevation
    2. Montane nanophaneritic tundra

Where forests occur they are made up of the following trees Nothofagus betuloides (coigüe de Magallanes), Drimys winteri (canelo), Pseudopanax laetevirens (sauco del diablo), Embothrium coccineum (notro), Maytenus magellanica (maitén), Pilgerodendron uviferum (ciprés de las Guaitecas) and Tepualia stipularis (tepú).

== Soils and climate ==
Soils are usually rich in turf and organic matter and poor in bases. Often they are also water-saturated. Granitoids, schists and ancient volcanic rocks make up the basement on which soils develop. Any previously existing regolith has been eroded by the Quaternary glaciations. It is not rare for bare rock surfaces to be exposed in the interior of islands.

The climate where Magellanic moorland grows can be defined as oceanic, snowy and isothermal with cool and windy summers. In the Köppen climate classification it has a tundra climate ET.
