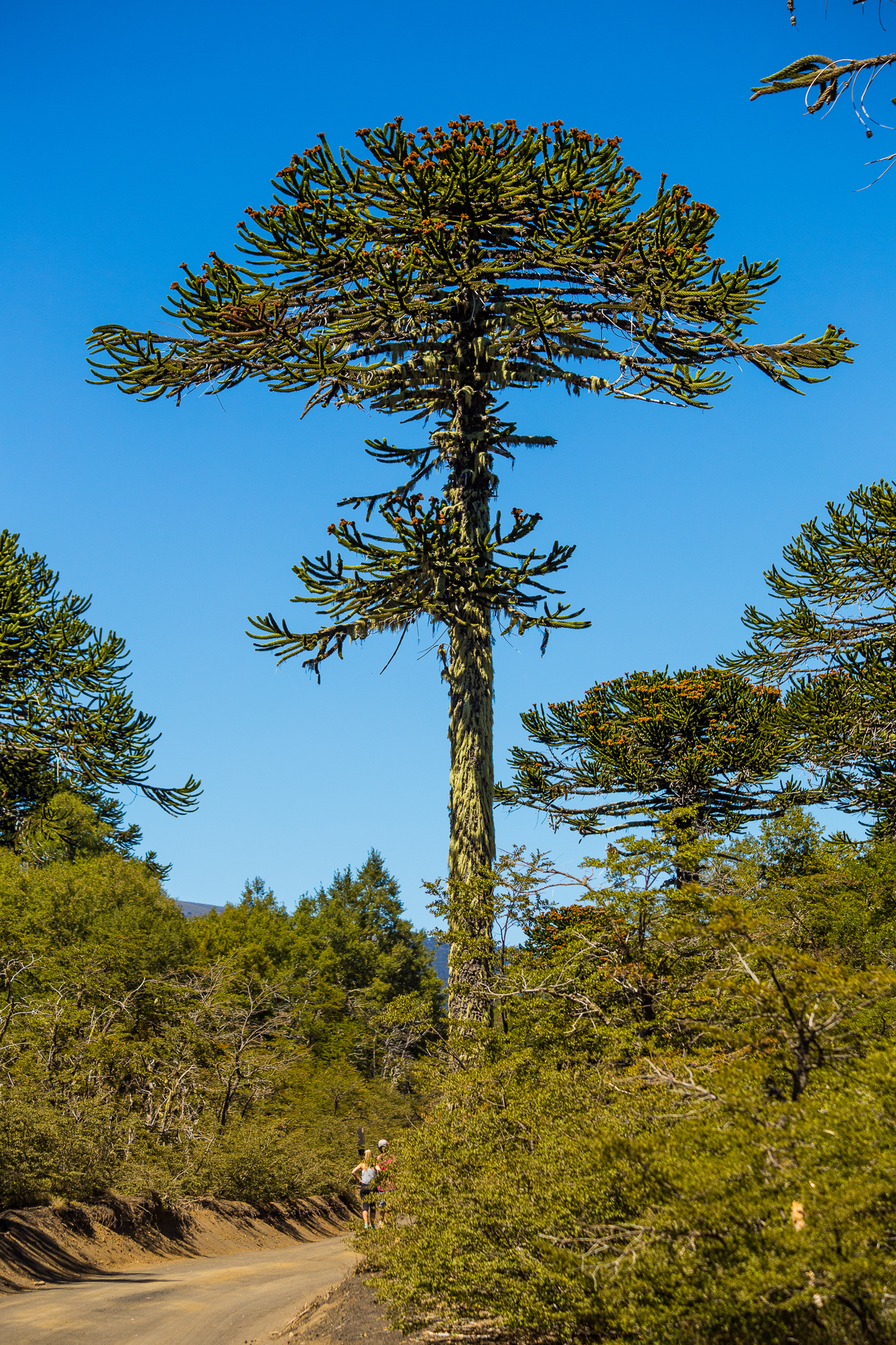

Conservation status
- Endangered (IUCN 3.1)
- CITES Appendix I

Scientific classification
- Kingdom: Plantae
- Clade: Tracheophytes
- Clade: Gymnosperms
- Division: Pinophyta
- Class: Pinopsida
- Order: Araucariales
- Family: Araucariaceae
- Genus: Araucaria
- Section: A. sect. Araucaria
- Species: A. araucana

Binomial name
- Araucaria araucana (Molina) K. Koch
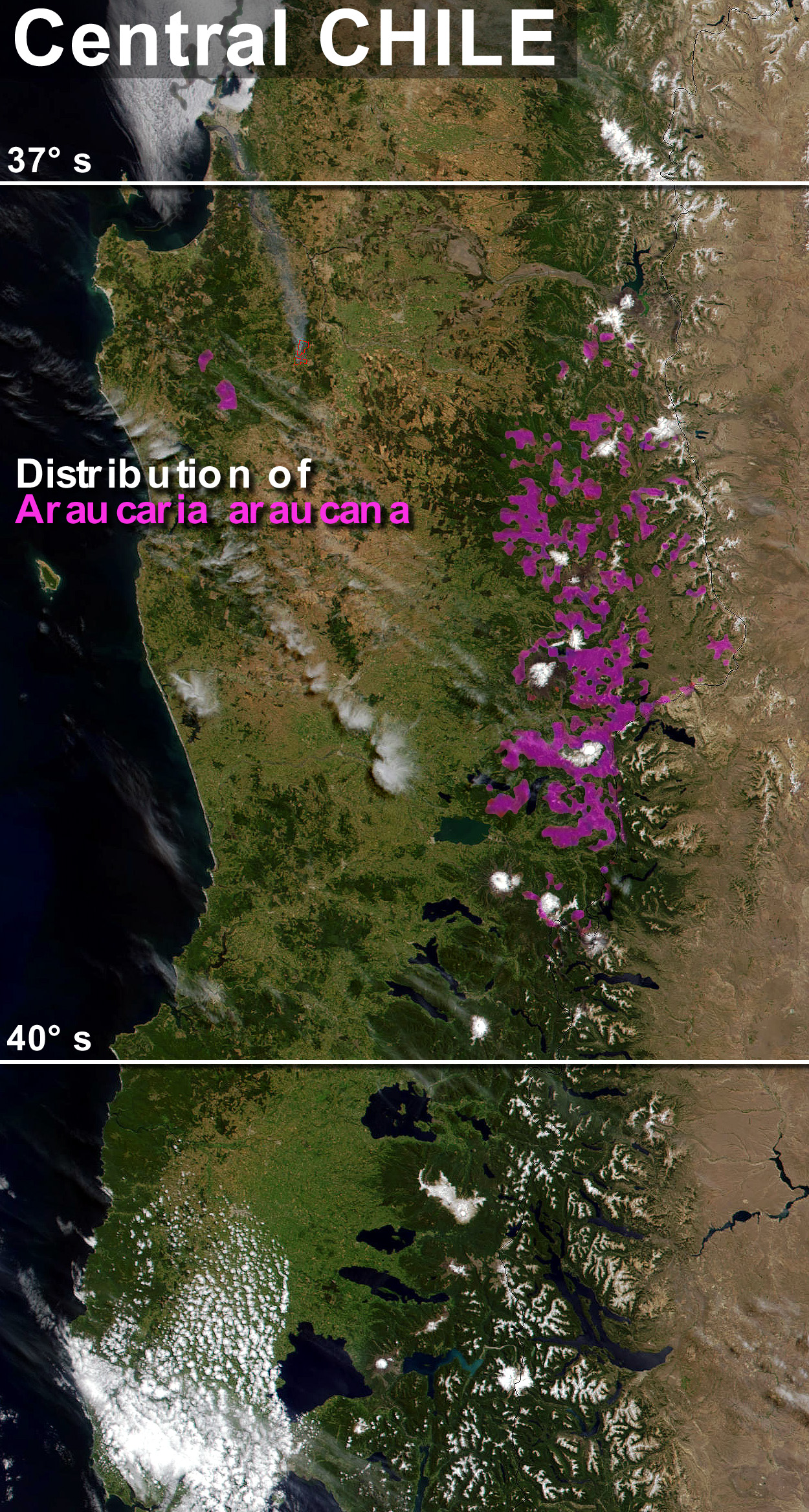
- Range of Araucaria araucana

= Araucaria araucana =

Chilean and Argentine coniferous tree

Araucaria araucana, commonly called the pewen, monkey-puzzle tree, pehuen or piñonero or Chile pine, is a species of conifer in the family Araucariaceae. It is a tree that grows to a height of 30–40 m (98–131 ft) and a trunk diameter of 1–1.5 m (3.3–4.9 ft). Native to central and southern Chile and western Argentina, it is the hardiest species in the conifer genus Araucaria.

It is the national tree of Chile and of the neighboring Argentine province of Neuquén. The IUCN changed its conservation status to Endangered in 2013, because logging, forest fires, and grazing have caused its population to dwindle.

== Description ==
The leaves are thick, tough, and scale-like, triangular, 3–4 cm (1 1/4–1 1/2 in) long, 1–3 cm (1/2–1 1/4 in) broad at the base, and with sharp edges and tips. According to Lusk (2001), the leaves remain attached and live for up to 24 years, and so cover almost all of the tree except for the older branches.

It is usually dioecious, with the male and female cones on separate trees, though occasional individuals bear cones of both sexes. The male (pollen) cones are oblong and cucumber-shaped, 4 cm (1 1/2 in) long at first, expanding to 8–12 cm (3–4 1/2 in) long by 5–6 cm (2–2 1/2 in) broad at pollen release. It is wind-pollinated. The female (seed) cones, which mature in autumn about 18 months after pollination, are globose, large, 12–20 cm (4 1/2–8 in) diameter, and hold about 200 seeds. The cones disintegrate at maturity to release the 3–4 cm (1 1/4–1 1/2 in) long nut-like seeds.

The thick bark of Araucaria araucana, up to 15 cm (6 in) thick, may be an adaptation to wildfire.

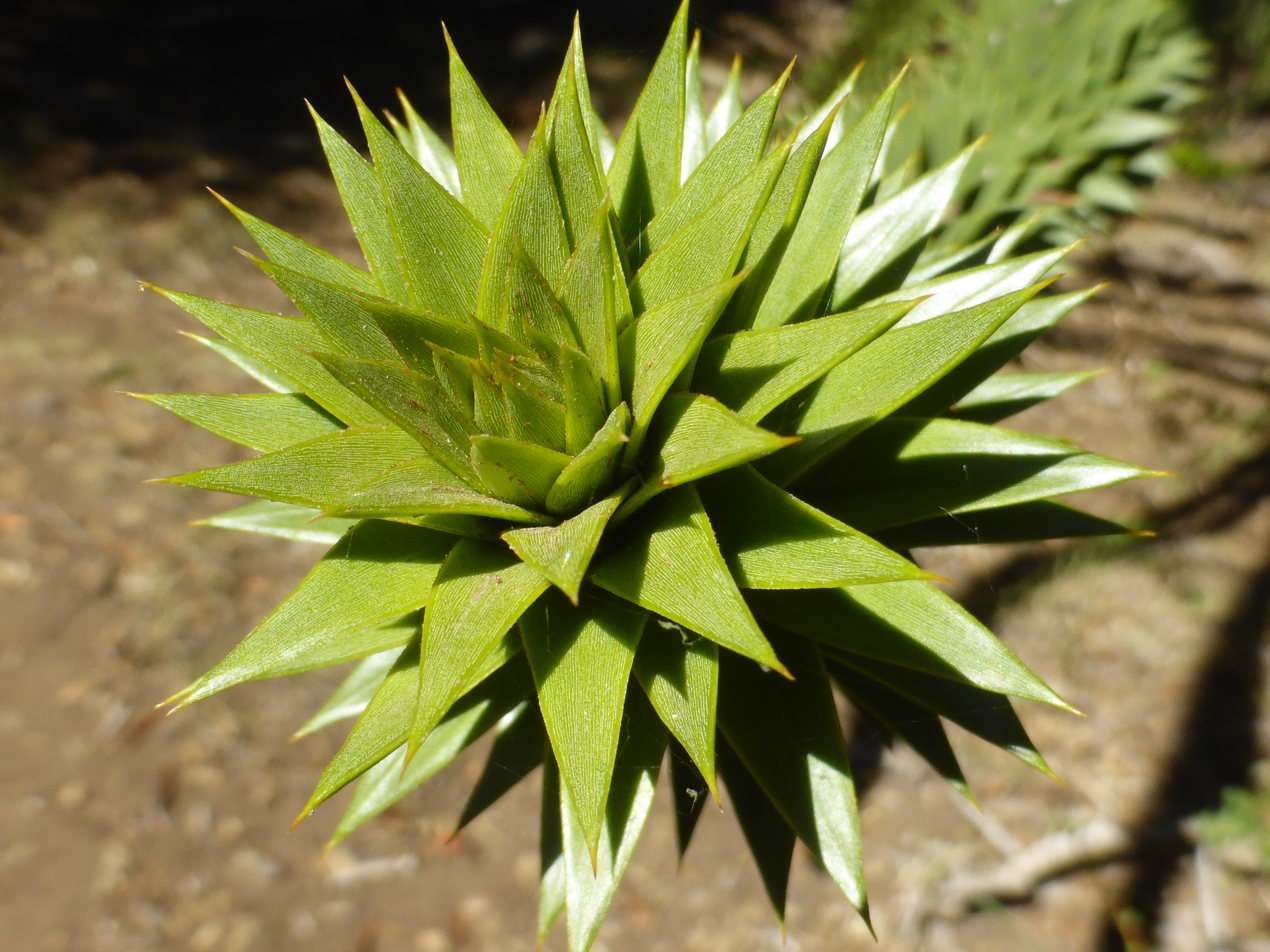
Detail of the spiny foliage

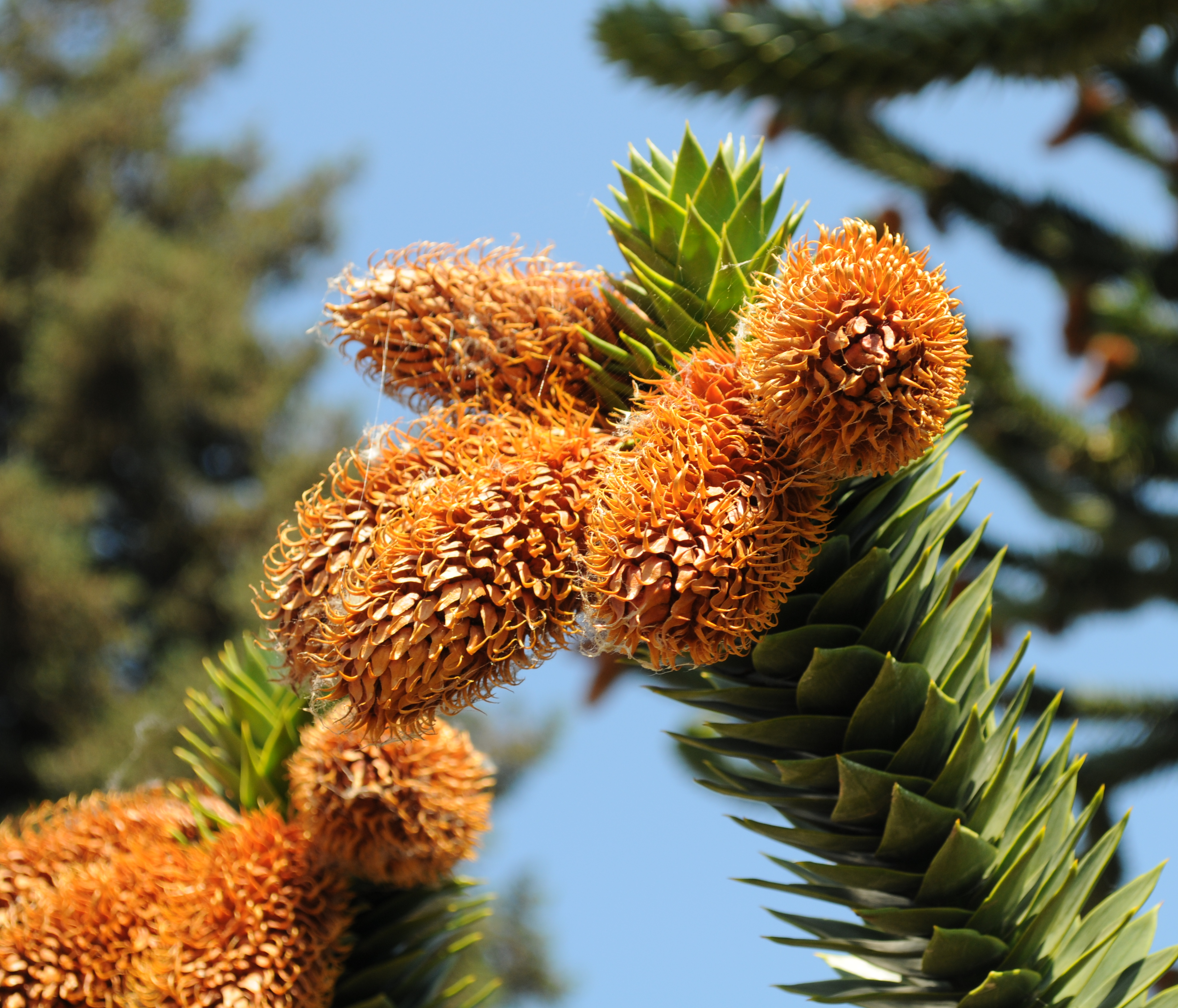
The male pollen cones

The female seed cone

The mature, thick bark

== Taxonomy ==
The nearest extant relative is Araucaria angustifolia, a South American Araucaria from Brazil and northeastern Argentina, which differs in the narrower leaves and shorter bract spines on the seed cones. Members of other sections of the genus Araucaria occur in Pacific Islands and in Australia, and include A. cunninghamii, A. heterophylla, and A. bidwillii.

== Etymology ==
First identified by Europeans in Chile in the 1780s, it was named Pinus araucana by J.I. Molina in 1782. In 1789, de Jussieu described a new genus called Araucaria based on the species, and in 1797, Pavón published a new description of the species which he called Araucaria imbricata (an illegitimate name, as it did not use Molina's older species epithet). Finally, in 1873, after several further redescriptions, Koch published the combination Araucaria araucana, validating Molina's species epithet in the genus.

The name araucana is derived from the native Araucanians who used the nuts (seeds) of the tree in Chile. A group of Araucanians living in the Andes, the Pehuenches, owe their name to their diet based on the harvesting of the A. araucaria seeds: from pewen or its Hispanic spelling pehuén, which means Araucaria, and che, which means people in Mapudungun. They believe the pewen was given by a deity or gwenachen to nourish their offspring; many pewen gathering festivals (ngillatun) are celebrated in both Chile and Argentina in gratitude to the tree's sustenance.

The origin of the popular English language name "monkey puzzle" lies in its early cultivation in Britain c. 1850, when the species was still very rare in gardens and not widely known. Sir William Molesworth, the owner of a young specimen at Pencarrow garden near Bodmin, Cornwall, was showing it to a group of friends when one of them, the lawyer Charles Austin, remarked "It would puzzle a monkey to climb that". As the species had no existing popular name, first "monkey puzzler" then "monkey puzzle" stuck. As of 1996, Pencarrow Garden had an avenue of mature monkey puzzle trees.

== Distribution and Habitat ==
The tree's native habitat is the lower slopes of the Chilean and Argentine south-central Andes, between approximately 1,000 m (3,300 ft) and 1,700 m (5,600 ft) elevation. In the Chilean Coast Range, A. araucana can be found as far south as Villa Las Araucarias (latitude 38° 30' S) at an altitude of 640 m. Juvenile trees exhibit a broadly pyramidal or conical habit, which naturally develops into the distinctive umbrella form of mature specimens as the tree ages. It prefers well-drained, slightly acidic, volcanic soil, but will tolerate almost any soil type provided it drains well. Seedlings are often not competitive enough to survive unless grown in a canopy gap or an exposed, isolated area. It is almost never found together with Chusquea culeou, Nothofagus dombeyi, or Nothofagus pumilio because they typically outcompete A. araucana.

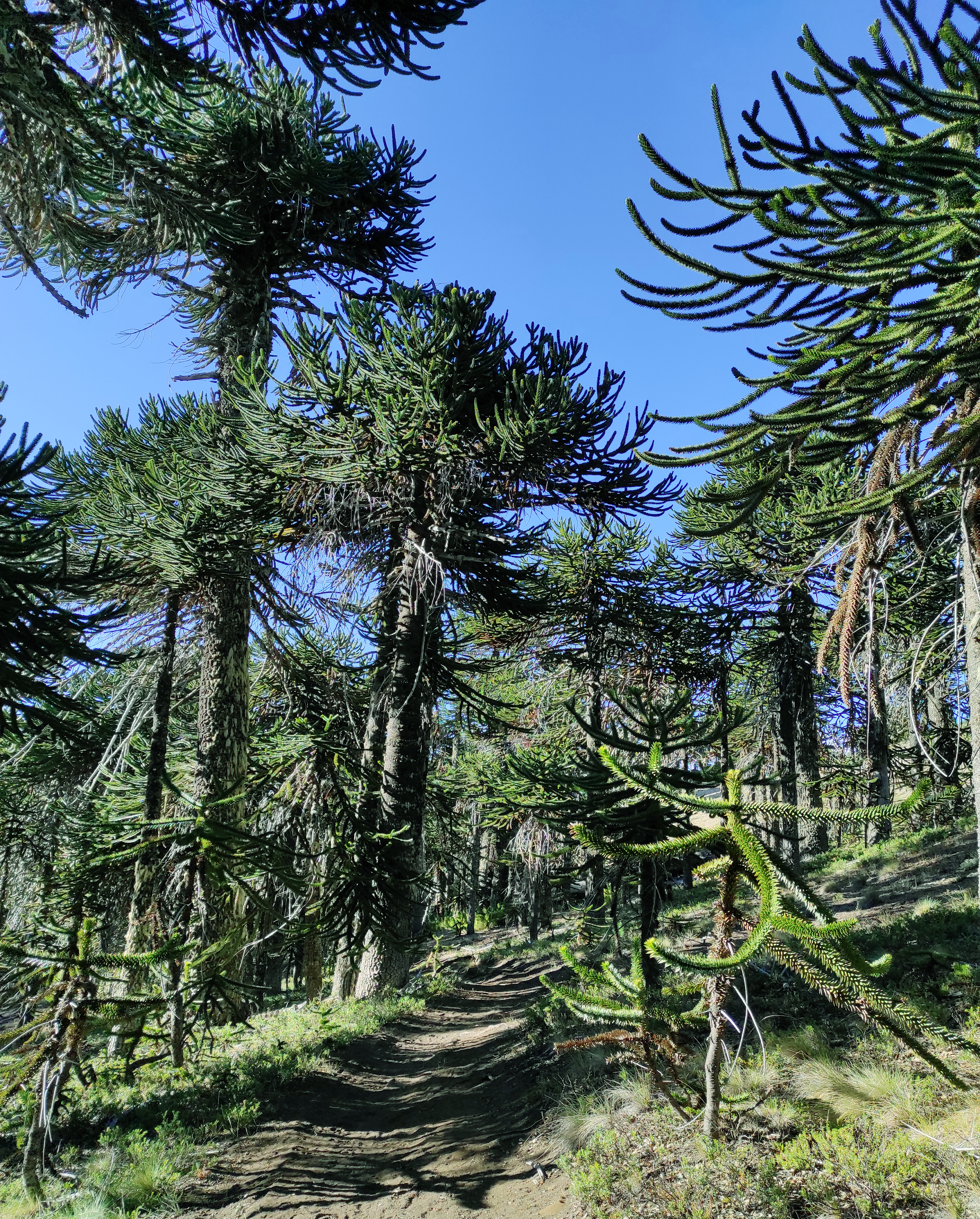
In Neuquén Province, Argentina

In Araucania, Chile

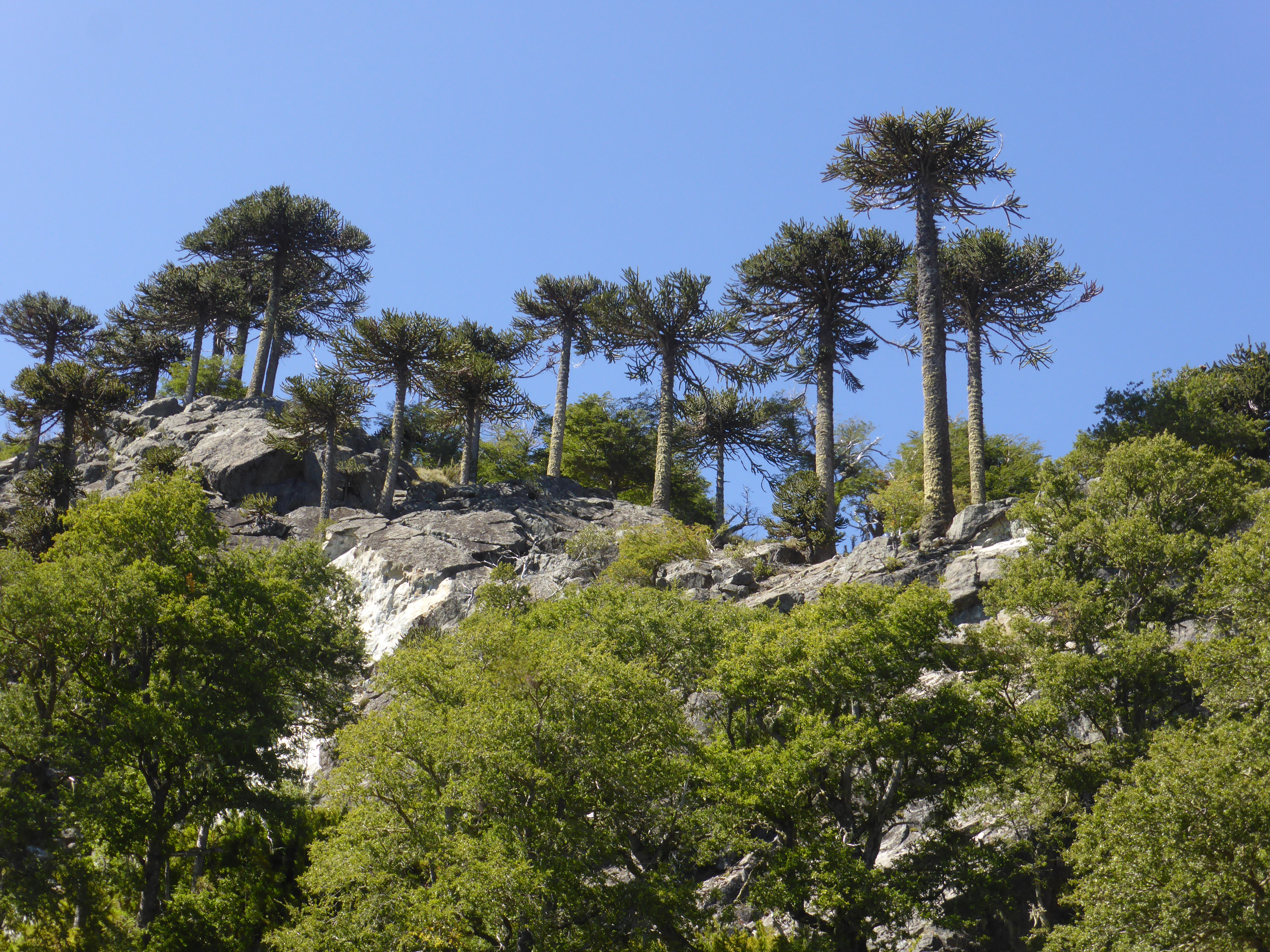
Growing in an exposed site

== Ecology ==
Araucaria araucana is a masting species producing seed crops that vary greatly between years, but are broadly synchronized across populations. A nine-year study found cone production was intermittent and highly synchronized over a large region. Heavy, synchronized crops may improve wind-pollination efficiency and temporarily overwhelm animals that consume the seeds, allowing a greater portion of the total to survive.

The large, heavy seeds, generally fall close to the parent tree, though some seeds are dispersed by animals. Rodents are important consumers and dispersers of its seeds. In Neuquén Province, the long haired grass mouse was observed carrying seeds more than 40 m (130 ft) and burying seeds intact in soils and leaf litter in sites favorable to seedling establishment. Another important seed dispersal agent is the austral parakeet. Although it frequently eats the seeds, partially eaten seeds remain capable of germination. In one study, partially eaten seeds germinated as successfully as intact seeds and did so more quickly than intact seeds in lab conditions suggesting a mutualistic relationship between the parrot and the tree. Adult trees are highly resistant to large ecological disturbances caused by volcanic activity; after events like these, the parakeets play their role by dispersing the seeds far from the affected territory.

Fire is an important influence on the structure and regeneration of monkey-puzzle forests. Individual trees may survive or resprout following a single fire, but severe or repeated fires cause high mortality and reduce seedling establishment. Because the heavy seeds generally only travel short distances, regeneration following fire is limited where few mature seed-producing trees survive nearby.

== Threats ==
Logging, long a major threat, was finally banned in 1990. Large fires burned thousands of acres of Araucaria forest in 2001–2002, and areas of national parks have also burned, destroying trees over 1300 years old. Overgrazing and invasive trees are also threats. Extensive human harvesting of piñones (Araucaria seeds) can prevent new trees from growing. A Global Trees Campaign project that planted 2000trees found a 90 percent 10-year survival rate.

Another major threat to the survival of A. araucana is the presence of non-native seed-eating species, in particular mammals, which have been shown to severely restrict the reproduction of the tree in comparison to native seed eaters. However, it is still unclear how large a role these invasive species play in threatening this tree; one study in particular found that native species played a larger role than non-natives in preventing reproduction through seed destruction. However, this may be due to the relatively recent introduction of the selected species, causing their population to be smaller than other invasive species.

Another study found that cattle ranching by small landowners and larger timber companies within the range of A. araucana severely affects regeneration of seedlings.

== Cultivation and uses ==
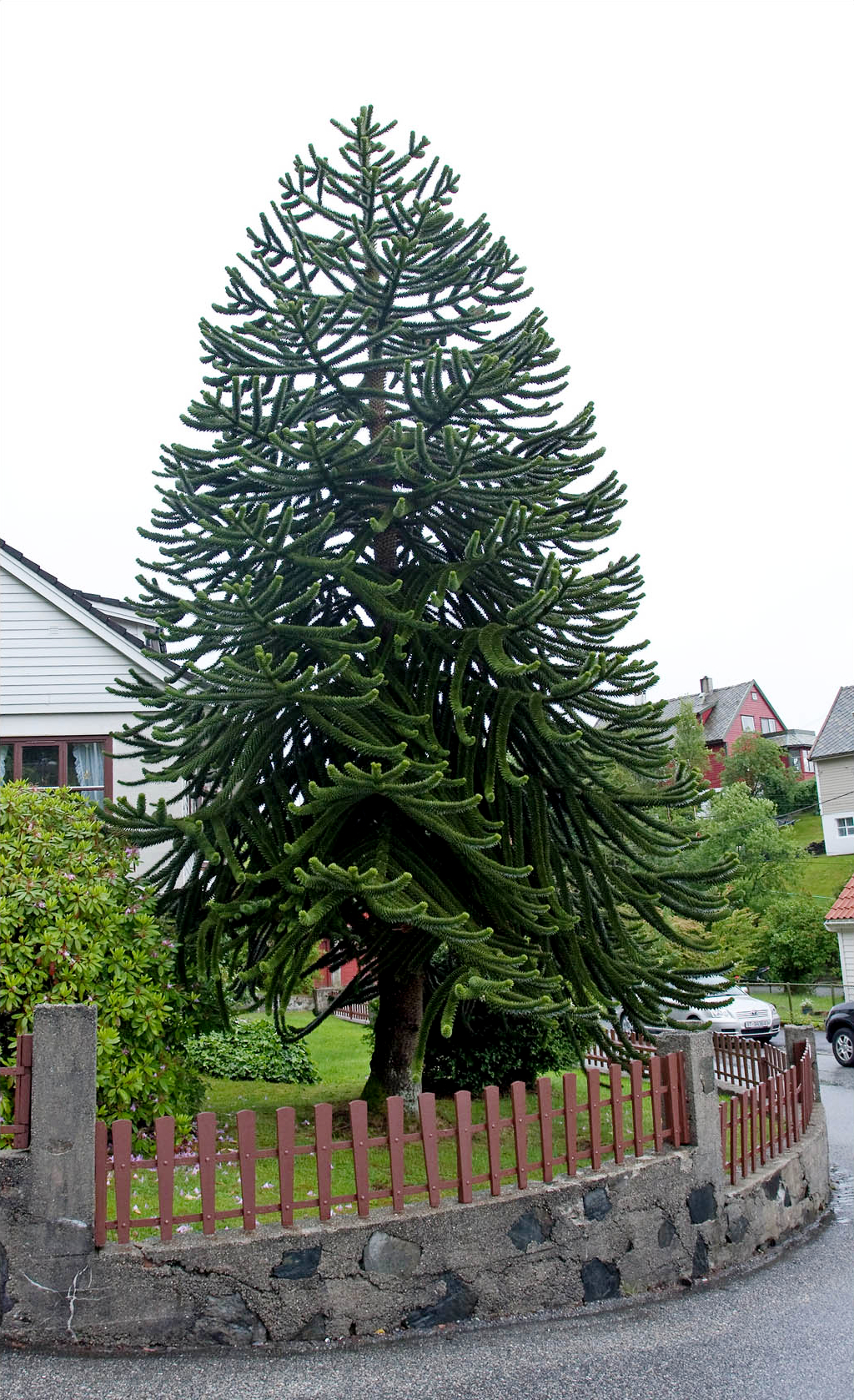
Monkey-puzzle tree growing in Bergen, Norway

Araucaria araucana is a popular garden tree, planted for the unusual effect of its thick, "reptilian" branches with a very symmetrical appearance. It prefers temperate oceanic climates with abundant rainfall, tolerating temperatures down to about −20 °C (−4 °F). It is far and away the hardiest member of its genus. It can grow well in western and central Europe (north to the Faroe Islands and Smøla in western Norway), in North America on the West Coast north to Baranof Island in Alaska and on the East Coast as far north as Long Island, in the southern hemisphere south of its native range to southern Chile, and also in New Zealand and southeastern Australia. It is tolerant of coastal salt spray but not air pollution.

Once valued because of its long, straight trunk, its current rarity and vulnerable status mean its wood is now rarely used; it is also sacred to some indigenous Mapuche. Timber from these trees was used for railway sleepers to access many industrial areas around the port of Chile. Before the tree became protected by law in 1990, some timber mills in Araucanía Region specialised in its wood because its durability and resistance to decay meant it was excellent for making wood products such as veneers and plywood.

The species is protected under Appendix I of the Convention on International Trade in Endangered Species (CITES), meaning international trade (including in parts and derivatives) is regulated by the CITES permitting system and commercial trade in wild-sourced specimens is prohibited.

Many young specimens and seeds were brought or sent back to England by William Lobb in the 19th century. While in Chile, he collected thousands of seeds of A. araucana from the Araucanía Region while working for Veitch Nurseries, which is based in Exeter, England. Chris Page, a University of Exeter botanist working at Camborne School of Mines (CSM), planted specimens in disused china clay pits in the St Austell area as part of his research into regreening former extractive minerals sites, which he presented in 2017 in the UK Parliament, with Professor Hylke Glass, also of CSM, as co-author.

A. araucana is locally naturalised in Great Britain, with, e.g., many young self-sown trees at Kyloe Woods in Northumberland.

=== Food ===
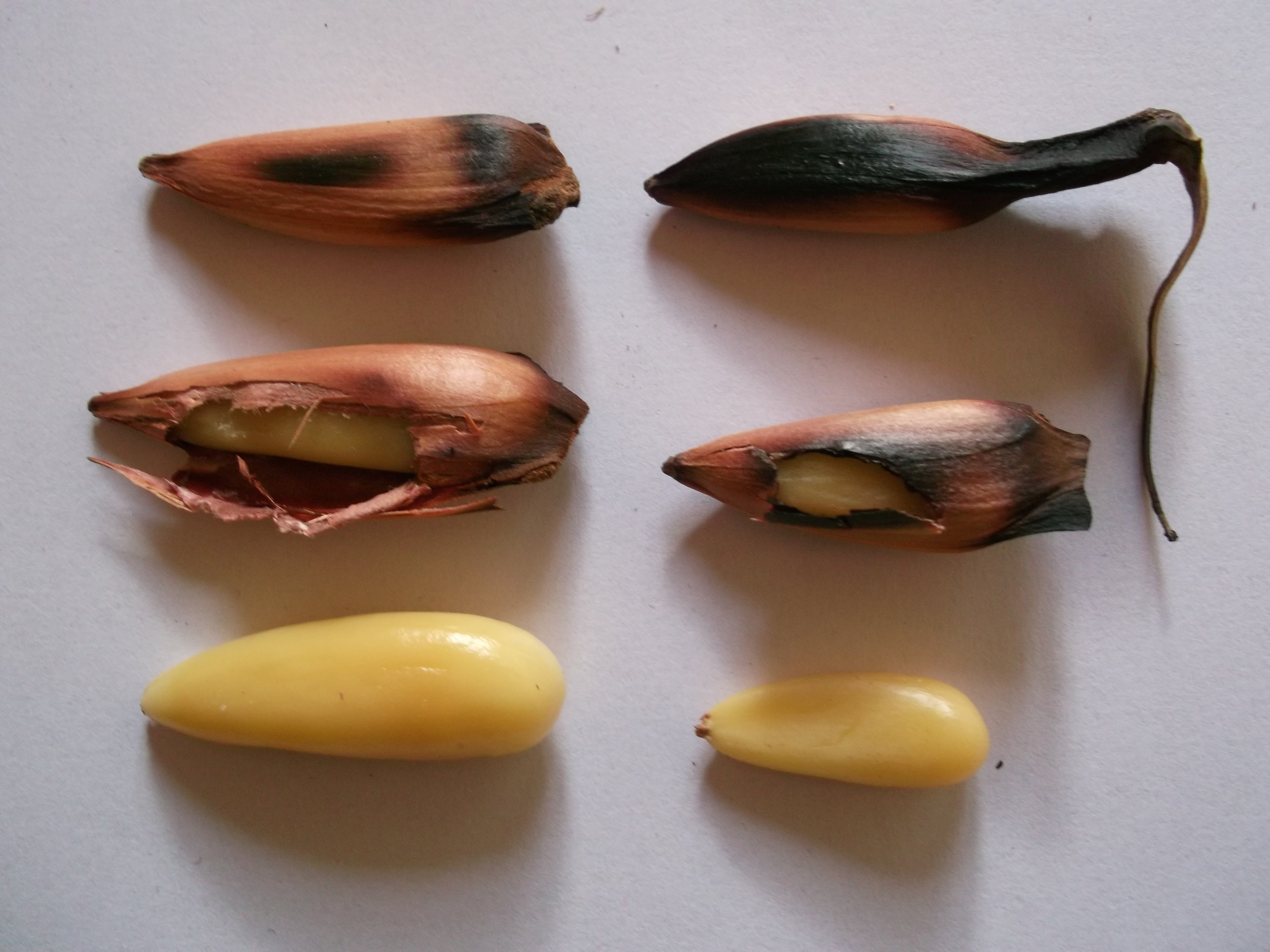
Roasted piñones

Its seeds (Mapudungun: ngulliw, Spanish: piñones) are edible, similar to large pine nuts, and are harvested by indigenous peoples in Argentina and Chile. The tree has some potential to be a food crop in other areas in the future, thriving in climates with cool oceanic summers, such as western Scotland, where other nut crops do not grow well. A group of six female trees with one male for pollination could yield several thousand seeds per year. Since the cones drop, harvesting is easy. The tree, however, does not yield seeds until it is around 30–40 years old, which discourages investment in planting orchards (although yields at maturity can be immense); once established, individuals can achieve ages beyond 1000years. Pest losses to rodents and feral pigs limits the yield for human consumption and forage fattening of livestock by A. araucana mast. The tree has a high degree of inter-year variability in mast volume, and this variation is synchronous within a given area. This evolved to take advantage of predator satiety.
