= San Pedro Wind Farm =

Wind farm in Chile

Coordinates: 42°17′3.71″S 73°55′48.57″W

San Pedro Wind Farm (Spanish: Parque Eólico San Pedro) is a wind farm in the heights of Cordillera del Piuchén in Chiloé Island, Chile. The construction of San Pedro Wind Farm was approved in 2011 by Sistema de Evaluación de Impacto Ambiental (SEIA), being one of four large wind farm projects approved by SEIA in the period of 2010–2017. Its total of 68 wind turbines were to be constructed in a two step programme, first 20 and then 48. Gamesa was contracted in both steps to construct wind turbines. The wind farm was built to produce 252 MW energy and it connects to Subestación Chiloé of the Sistema Interconectado Central, Chile's main power grid, though a 21.6 kilometres (13.4 mi) long transmission line. Personnel of the wind farm project were fast to collect signatures of approval from local residents with indigenous surnames, reportedly to avoid legal issues associated with the ILO-convention 169.

The local community of San Pedro benefited initially by the improvement of roads and the school infrastructure that were part of the project. The commuting time to the main road, was shortened considerably improving connections for the formerly isolated San Pedro community with the towns of Dalcahue and Castro. After this the relation of the wind farm enterprise with the local community slowly deteriorated. There are claims of unfulfilled promises and unequal treatment of different families. There have also been complaints about the dust arisen from the roads and of dangerously high speed at which personnel of the wind farm drives through in populated areas.

The builders and owners of the wind farm are the enterprises Trans Antarctic Energía and Bosques de Chiloé.
