= Las Araucarias, Temuco =

Coordinates: 38°45′29.66″S 72°41′41.60″W

Las Araucarias
- Interactive map of Las Araucarias
- Region: Araucanía
- Province: Cautín
- Municipality: Temuco
- Commune: Temuco

Government
  - Type: Municipality
  - Alcalde: Roberto Neira Aburto (PPD)

Population (2017)
  - Total: 136

Sex
  - Men: 77
  - Women: 59
- Time zone: UTC-4 (Chilean Standard)
  - Summer (DST): UTC-3 (Chilean Daylight)
- Area code: Country + town = 56 + 45

Las Araucarias is a hamlet (Spanish: caserío) in Araucanía Region, Chile. It is near the center of Araucanía region about 9.4 km west of downtown Temuco.
