= Troltrolhue =

Mountain in Chile

- Location within Chile

Highest point
- Elevation: 867 m (2,844 ft)
- Coordinates: 39°35′24.68″S 72°34′50.83″W

Geography
- Location: Chile
- Parent range: Loncoche Massif

Geology
- Rock age: Paleozoic
- Mountain type(s): Block mountain, Mittelgebirge

Troltrolhue or Cordillera Troltrolhue is a mountain and mountain range in Los Ríos Region, southern Chile. The mountain range runs from west to east across five communes; Mariquina, Lanco, Máfil, Los Lagos and Panguipulli. It lies south and east of Cruces River and west of Calafquén and Panguipulli lakes. Part of the southeastern slope of the mountain range is a fault scarp. There are historical placer-type gold mines in the Troltrolhue.
