= Linguee =

Online bilingual concordance

- Headquarters: Cologne, Germany
- Founders: Gereon Frahling, Leonard Fink
- Website: https://www.linguee.com/

Linguee is an online bilingual concordance that provides an online dictionary for a number of language pairs, including many bilingual sentence pairs. As a translation aid, Linguee differs from machine translation services like Google Translate, and is more similar in function to a translation memory. Linguee is operated by Cologne-based DeepL SE (formerly DeepL GmbH and Linguee GmbH), which was established in Cologne in December 2008.

== Technology ==
Linguee uses specialized webcrawlers to search the Internet for appropriate bilingual texts and to divide them into parallel sentences. The paired sentences identified undergo automatic quality evaluation by a human-trained machine learning algorithm that estimates the quality of translation. The user can set the number of pairs using a fuzzy search, access, and the ranking of search results with the previous quality assurance and compliance is influenced by the search term. Users can also rate translations manually, so that the machine learning system is trained continuously.

== Sources ==
In addition to serving the bilingual Web, Patent translated texts as well as the EU Parliament protocols and laws of the European Union (EUR-Lex) as sources. In addition to officially translated text from EU sources, its French language service relies on translated texts from Canadian government documents, websites, and transcripts, along with Canadian national institutions and organisations which often provide bilingual services. According to the operator Linguee offers access to approximately 100 million translations.

== History ==
Linguee pioneered the online bilingual concordance. The concept behind it was conceived in the fall of 2007 by former Google employee Gereon Frahling and developed in the following year along with Leonard Fink. The business idea was recognized in 2008 with the main prize of a competition founded by the German Federal Ministry of Economics and Technology. In April 2009, the web service was made available to the public. Linguee is operated by DeepL SE (formerly DeepL GmbH and Linguee GmbH) based in Cologne.

In 2017, a team of Linguee employees around Jarosław Kutyłowski developed and launched the DeepL Translator, a freely-available translation service capable of translating to and from seven major European languages. Since then, DeepL was gradually expanded to offer 24 languages and 552 language pairs. With increasing focus on Kutyłowski's product (DeepL), Frahling decided in 2019 to leave the company. Kutyłowski restructured the company into the Societas Europaea DeepL SE in 2021.

== See also ==
- Neural machine translation
- Parallel text
- Translation memory

== Bibliography ==
- Katsnelson, Alla (August 29, 2022). "Poor English skills? New AIs help researchers to write better". Nature. 609 (7925): 208–209. doi:10.1038/d41586-022-02767-9. PMID 36038730. S2CID 251931306.
