= Lingue River =

Lingue
- Native name: Río Lingue (Spanish)

Location
- Country: Chile

Physical characteristics
- Source
  - location: Valdivian Coast Range
- Mouth
  - location: Pacific Ocean
  - elevation: 0 m (0 ft)

Lingue River (Spanish: Río Lingue) is a river in the commune of Mariquina, southern Chile. It originates in the Valdivian Coast Range and flows westward where it empties in the Pacific Ocean at the town of Mehuín. On its northern boundary, the river reaches the basin of the river Queule. On the southern end, it reaches the Valdivia river basin.

== See also ==
- List of rivers of Chile
