= Cerro Vicuña Mackenna =

Mountain in Chile

- Location within Chile

Highest point
- Elevation: 3,114 m (10,217 ft)
- Coordinates: 24°27′01″S 70°02′55″W

Naming
- English translation: Mount Vicuña Mackenna

Geography
- Country: Chile
- Parent range: Chilean Coast Range

Climbing
- Easiest route: Hike

Cerro Vicuña Mackenna is the highest point in the Sierra Vicuña Mackenna and the Chilean Coast Range. The peak has a stark desert climate, typical of the Atacama Desert. The peak is named after Benjamín Vicuña Mackenna.
