= Toco orogeny =

The Toco orogeny was a mountain building affecting the rocks of northern Chile and northwestern Argentina during the Late Carboniferous and Permian. In 1991, researchers Bahlburg and Breitkurz noted that Chilean rocks had a 100 million lull magmatic and metamorphic "lull" from the Silurian to the Carboniferous. They defined the Toco orogeny as the period when active margin conditions returned in the region.

== See also ==
- Geology of Chile
- Geology of Argentina
- List of orogenies
