= Chilean Coast Range =

Mountain range in South America

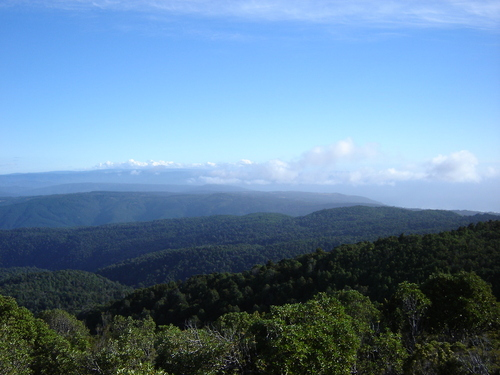
- View from Cerro Oncol

Highest point
- Peak: Cerro Vicuña Mackenna
- Elevation: 3,114 m (10,217 ft)
- Coordinates: 24°27′01″S 70°02′55″W

Dimensions
- Length: 3,100 km (1,900 mi) North-South

Geography
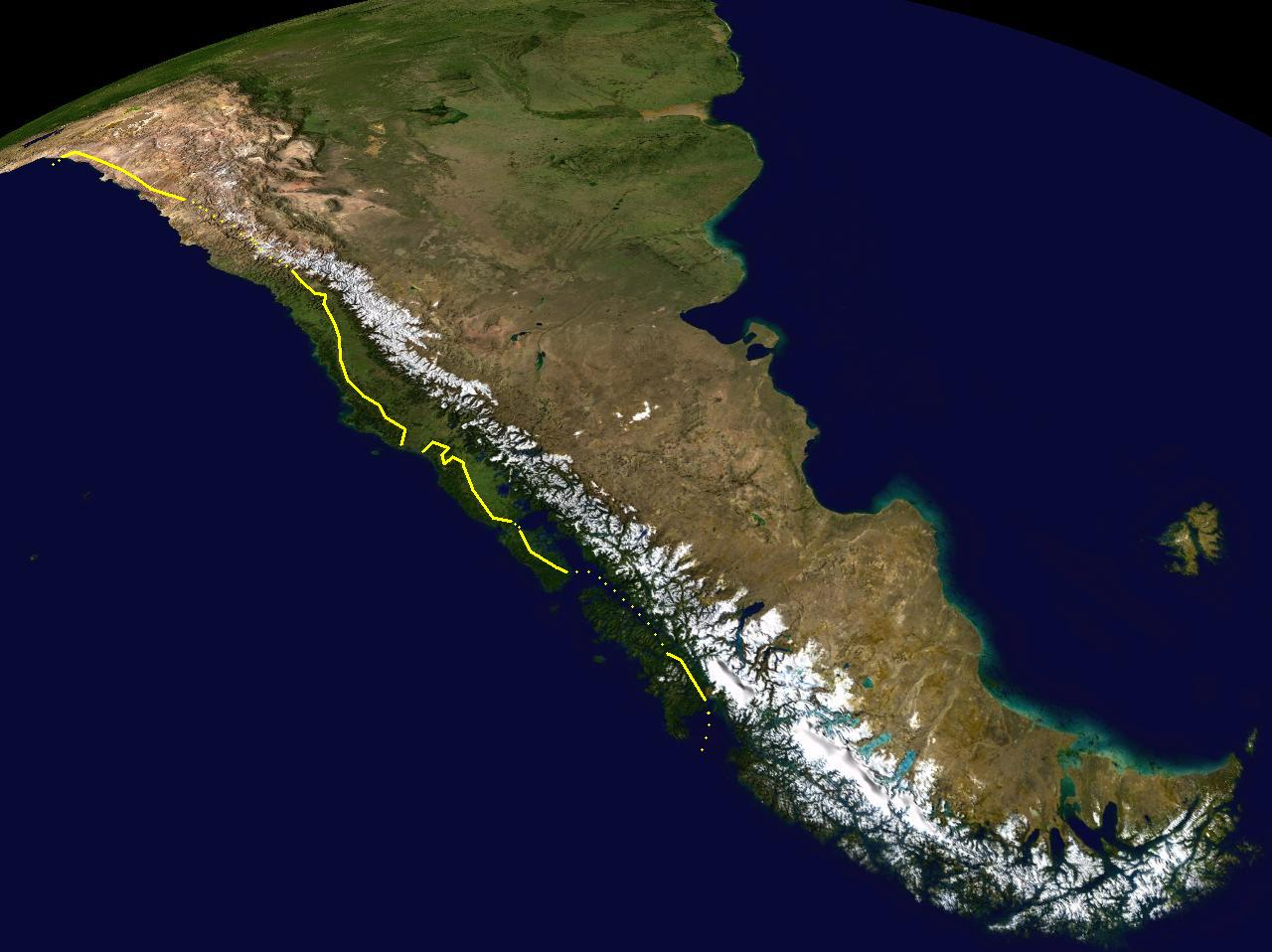
- The eastern border of the Chilean Coast Range is marked with yellow. Uncertain borders are marked with dots.
- Country: Chile
- Range coordinates: 32°58′32″S 71°00′49″W
- Parent range: Andes

The Chilean Coast Range (Spanish: Cordillera de la Costa) is a mountain range that runs from north to south along the Pacific coast of South America parallel to the Andean Mountains, extending from Morro de Arica in the north to Taitao Peninsula, where it ends at the Chile triple junction, in the south. The range has a strong influence on the climate of Chile since it produces a rain shadow to the east. Because of this the vegetation growing on the seaward slopes is much more exuberant than in the interior. Compared to the coastal lowlands and the Intermediate Depression, it is sparsely populated with land use varying from protected areas to grazing and silviculture. The range is present in all Chilean regions, except for Coquimbo Region and Magallanes Region.

== Geography ==
Like the Andes, the coastal range becomes progressively lower with increasing latitude. The range begins at Morro de Arica in the north and reaches its highest point, of 3,114 m (10,217 ft) above sea level, in Sierra Vicuña Mackenna in the Antofagasta Region. Between Copiapó and Aconcagua rivers, in the so-called Norte Chico region, the range fuses with the Andes. Just north of Santiago the range separates from the Andes but comes close to it again near Paine, a southern suburb of Santiago, and San Fernando. From Santiago south the range loses height until reaching the Bío-Bío River, beyond which the Nahuelbuta range emerges which reaches about 1500 m in its central parts. South of Nahuelbuta Range, in the Araucanía Region, the coastal range is replaced by a flatland area. South of Toltén River the range rises again as the Cordillera de Mahuidanchi. Beyond the heights of Corral this range changes into Cordillera Pelada. From Chacao Channel south the range is penetrated by the sea creating islands and peninsulas. Chiloé Island, the largest of these, has two ranges: Cordillera del Piuchén from Chacao Channel to Cucao Lake and Pirulil Range in the southern half. South of Chiloé the portions of the range above sea level form the Guaitecas and the Chonos Archipelagos. The southern extreme of the range forms the Taitao Peninsula and its sub-peninsula Tres Montes.

The range can be divided in several minor ranges. Some of these ranges and their boundaries are:

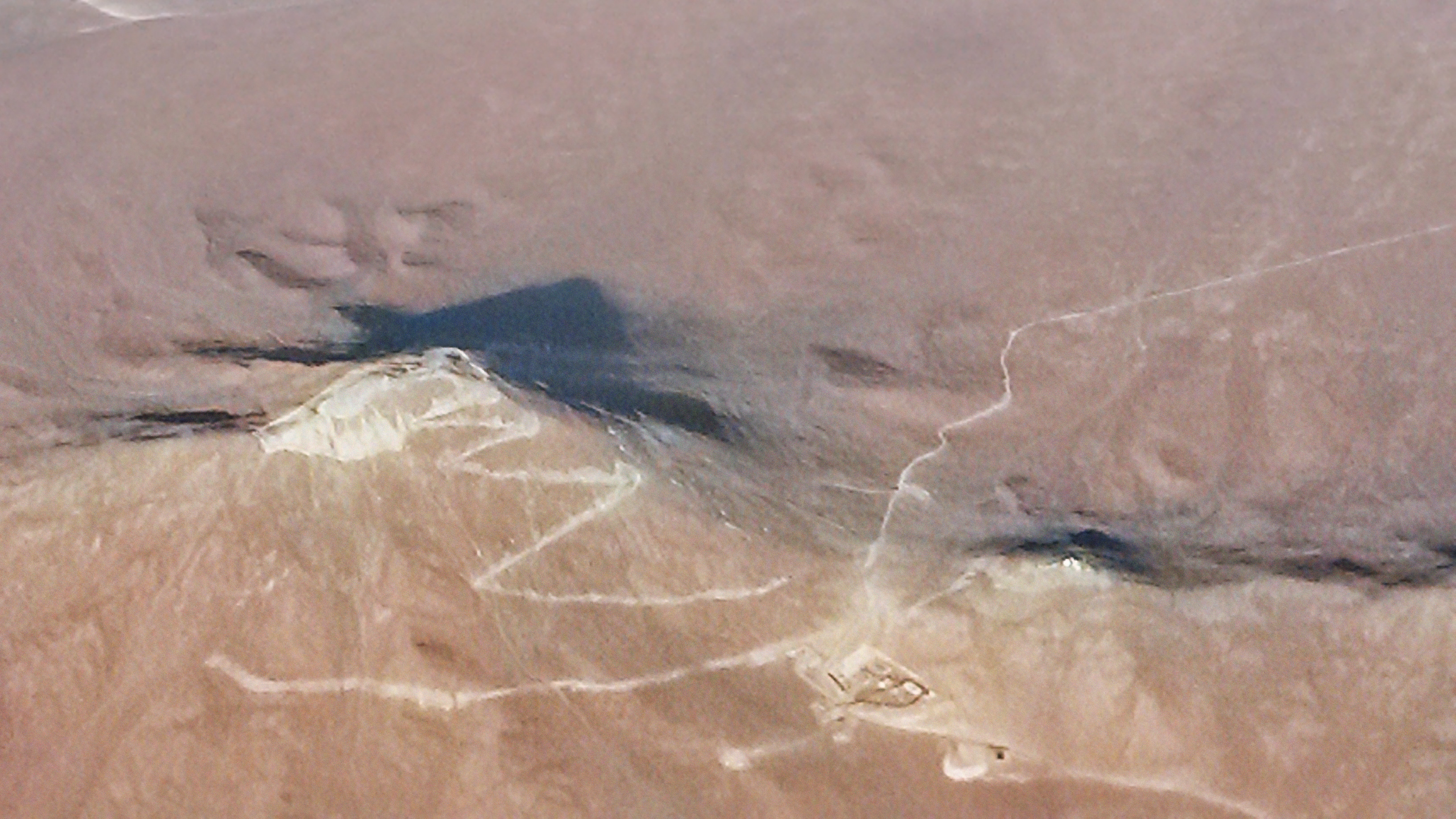
Cerro Armazones, home of the E-ELT, is located in the Sierra Vicuña Mackenna.

- Sierra Vicuña Mackenna (24–25° S)
- Vizcachas Mountains (33° S)
- Cordillera de Nahuelbuta (37–38° S)
  - Imperial-Toltén River lowland
- Cordillera de Queule (39°)
- Cordillera de Mitropulli (39°)
  - Lingue River
- Loncoche Massif
  - Cordillera de Troltrolhue
  - Cerro Llecué
- Cordillera de Oncol (39° S)
  - Valdivia River
- Altos de Valdivia (40° S)
  - Chaihuín River
- Cordillera Pelada (40° S)
- Cordillera El Sarao (41° S)
- Cordillera del Piuchén (42° S)
  - Cucao and Huillinco Lake
- Pirulil Range (42–43° S)

== Geology ==
The range has no single structural or lithological origin but is the result of the alignment of horst, forearc highs and upthrusted blocks along Chile's coast. The range was separated from the Andes during the Tertiary rise of the Andes due to the subsidence of the Intermediate Depression.

The range is made of different lithological units. From Valparaíso Region to Lanalhue Fault the bedrock is largely made up of the Coastal Batholith of central Chile. These igneous rocks were once part of a proto-Andean magmatic belt. South of Lanalhue Fault most of the range is made up by the Bahía Mansa Metamorphic Complex which is made up of medium grade metamorphic rocks including schists. The analogous granites of the northern part of the coast range are placed inside the Andes in this latitudes.

During the Miocene regions of the Chilean Coast Range hosted several volcanoes. At present it does not show any sign of volcanic activity.

The northern part of the Chilean Coast Range contains a series of iron ore deposits known as the Chilean Iron Belt which are aligned along the Atacama Fault.

== See also ==
- Climate of Chile
- Geology of Chile
- Chilean Central Valley
- Atacama Desert
