= Cordillera de Oncol =

Mountain range in Chile

Valdivian Coast Range Cordillera de Mahuidanchi
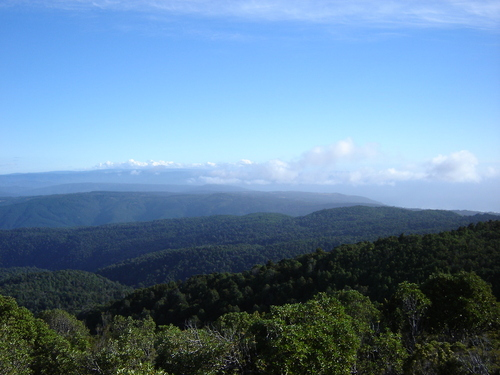
- View from Cerro Oncol

Highest point
- Peak: Cerro Oncol
- Elevation: 715 m (2,346 ft)

Geography
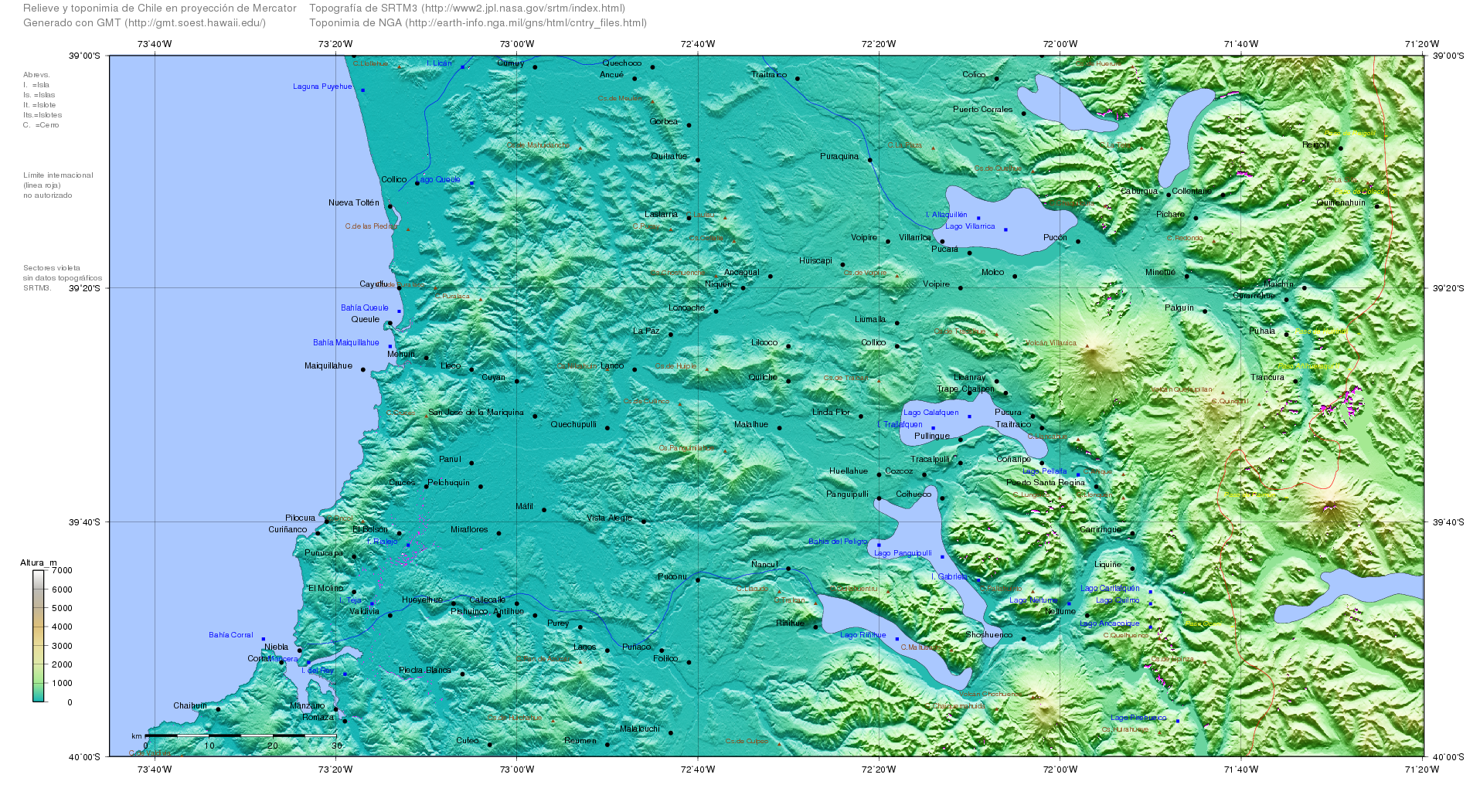
- Map showing the Valdivian Coast Range (Cordillera de Mahuidanchi) in the west.
- Country: Chile
- Region: Los Ríos Region
- Range coordinates: 40°04′S 73°25′W
- Parent range: Chilean Coast Range (Cordillera de la Costa)

Geology
- Orogeny: Toco
- Rock age: Carboniferous

The Cordillera de Oncol (sometimes called Valdivian Coast Range) is a mountain range, located along the Pacific coast in southern Chile. It is part of the Chilean Coast Range System (Cordillera de la Costa). It was named for the city of Valdivia. The highest point of the range is Cerro Oncol, at 715 m.

== Natural history ==
The Valdivian Coastal Range has about 1 million acres (4,000 km^{2}) of Valdivian temperate rain forests habitat, approximately one-quarter of which are protected.

The region has long been geographically isolated, making it a haven for endemic species. Some of the rare species that inhabit the Valdivian Coastal Range include the pudu (the smallest deer in the world), the common degu, the marine otter, and the monito del monte, or mountain monkey (actually a marsupial).

== See also ==
- Chilean Coast Range
- Cruces River
- Punucapa
- Valdivia
- Valdivian Coastal Reserve
