= Cordillera de Nahuelbuta =

Mountain range in Chile

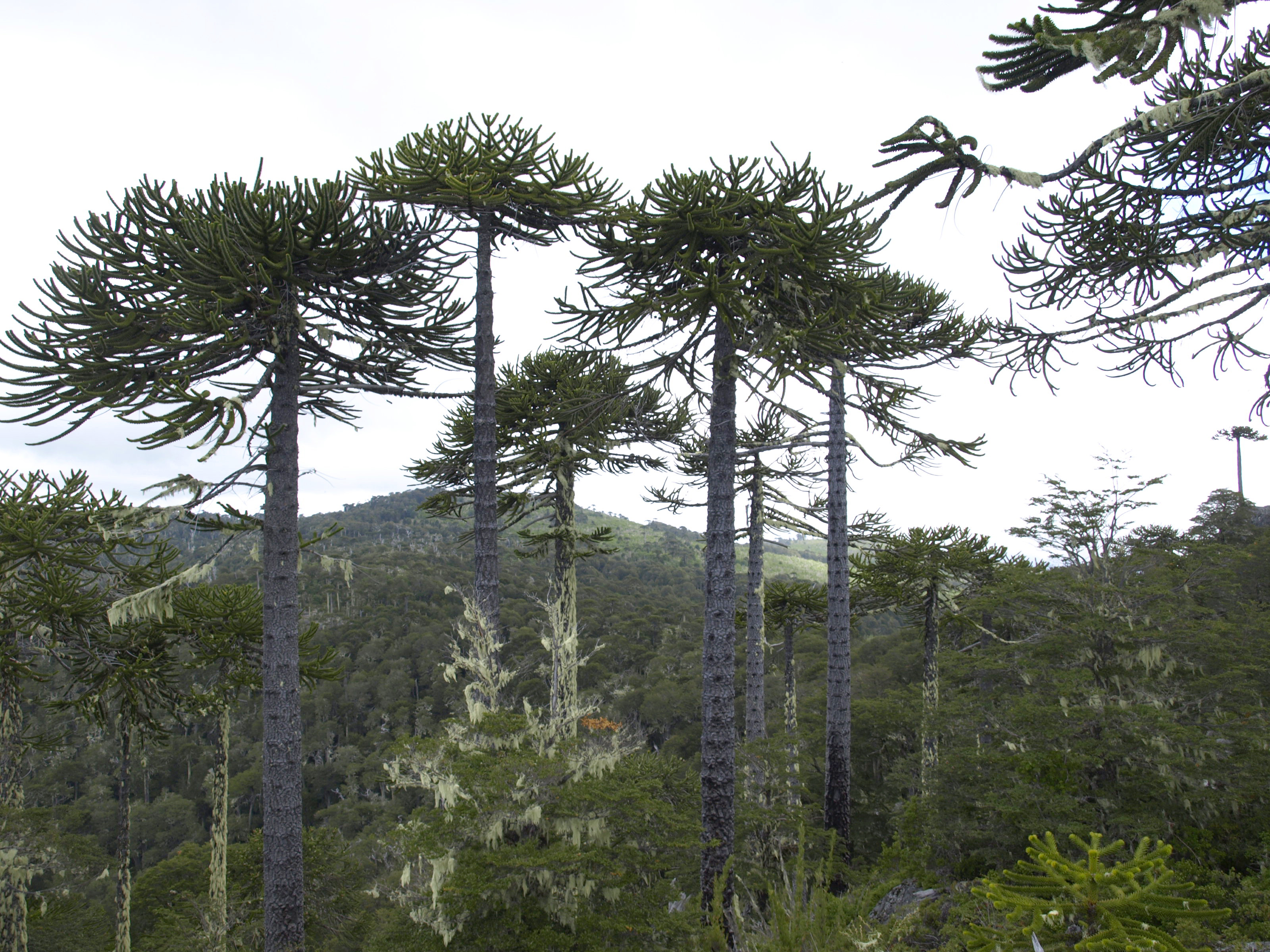
- Araucaria araucana forest

Highest point
- Peak: Alto Nahuelbuta
- Elevation: 1,565 m (5,135 ft)

Geography
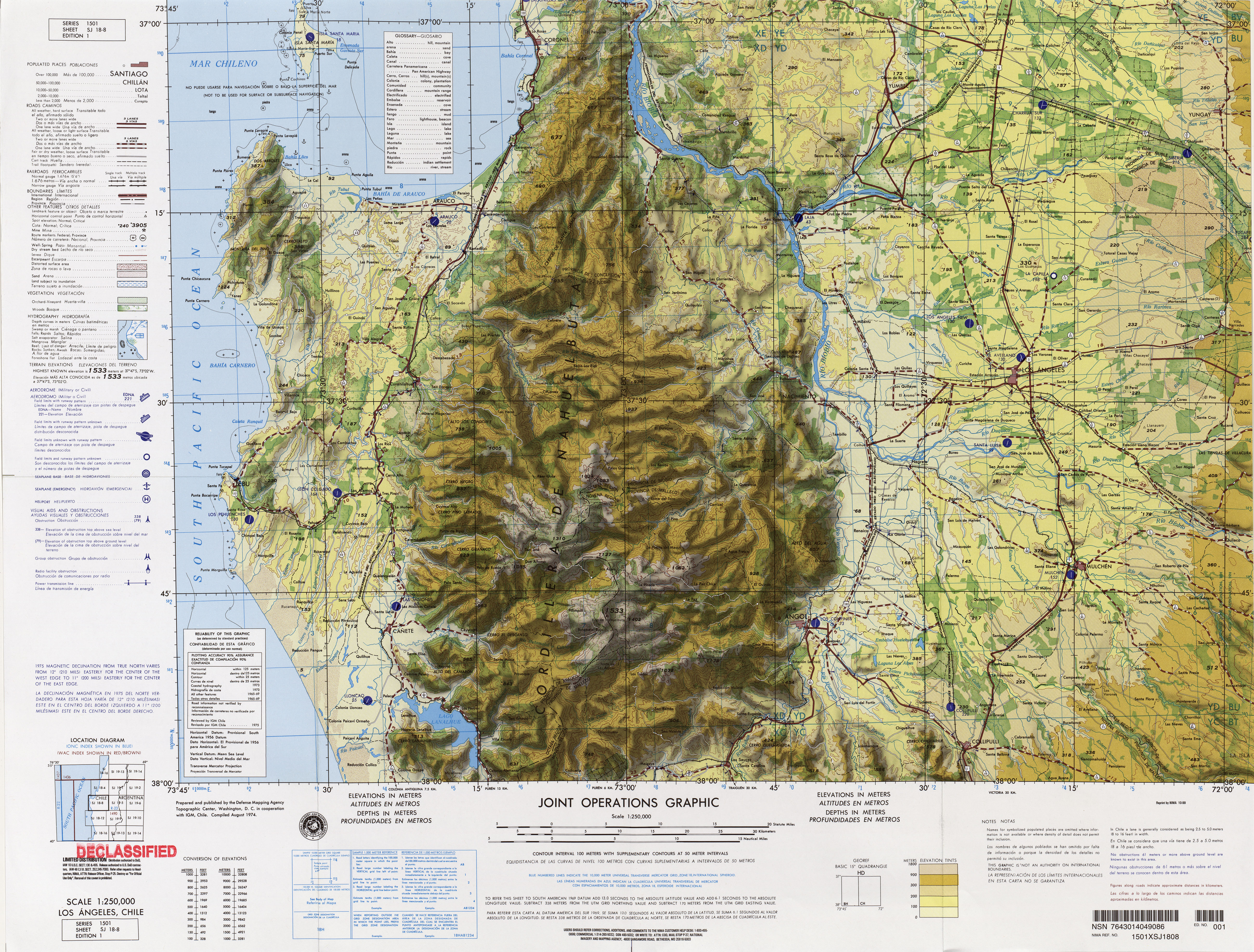
- Map of the Nahuelbuta region
- Country: Chile
- Region(s): Bío Bío Region, La Araucanía Region
- Range coordinates: 37°43′S 73°02′W
- Parent range: Cordillera de la costa

The Nahuelbuta Range or Cordillera de Nahuelbuta (Spanish pronunciation: [nawelˈβuta]) is a mountain range in Bio-Bio and Araucania Region, southern Chile. It is located along the Pacific coast and forms part of the larger Chilean Coast Range. The name of the range derives from the Mapudungun words nahuel (jaguar) and futa (big).

Much of Cordillera Nahuelbuta is covered by pine and eucalyptus monoculture plantations. Some areas of plantations were ones that were being subject to severe soil erosion before the plantations while others were native forest that was cleared with fire to establish plantations. The bulk of the plantations were established in the 1970s, 1980s and 1990s.

At Villa las Araucarias in Cordillera Nahuelbuta there is a small remnant of some of the southernmost Araucaria araucana trees in the Chilean Coast Range. By 1950 there were 1000 ha of Araucaria araucana forest around this site, but by 2016 only 40 ha remained.

Historically Cordillera de Nahuelbuta and its surrounding valleys were the foci of the Arauco War. The Spanish designs for this region was to exploit the placer deposits of gold around the range using unfree Mapuche labour from the densely populated valleys. For this purpose the Spanish established a series of settlements and fortified houses around Cordillera de Nahuelbuta.

== See also ==
- Arauco Basin
- Coastal Batholith of central Chile
- Nahuelbuta National Park
- Forestry in Chile
