= El abuelo =

Abuelo or el abuelo (Spanish: The Grandfather) may refer to:

== Film ==
- The Grandfather (1925 film) (Spanish: El abuelo), Spanish silent film
- El Abuelo (1954 film) (Spanish: El abuelo), Argentine film
- The Grandfather (1998 film) (Spanish: El abuelo), Spanish film
- El Abuelo (2017 film), Peruvian-Colombian road comedy-drama film

== Other uses ==
- Miguel Abuelo (1946–1988), Argentine rock musician

== See also ==
- Alerce Milenario, the tree also known as "Gran Abuelo" (Spanish: Great-Grandfather)
- Cheirocerus abuelo (C. abuelo), a species of catfish
- Grandfather (disambiguation)
- Abuelita (disambiguation) (Spanish: granny, granma)
- Abuela (disambiguation) (Spanish: grandmother)
- Nana (disambiguation) (Spanish: grandmother)
- Abu (disambiguation) (Spanish: grandparent)
