= Cerro Chaihuín =

Mountain in Chile

- Location within Chile

Highest point
- Elevation: 880 m (2,890 ft)
- Coordinates: 40°5′37.25″S 73°31′7.84″W

Geography
- Location: Chile
- Parent range: Cordillera Pelada

Geology
- Rock age: Palaeozoic

Cerro Chaihuín is a mountain in the Cordillera Pelada. It lies 13 km east of Colún Beach and Hueicolla and 16 km southeast of Caleta Chaihuín.
