= Grandfather (disambiguation) =

A grandfather is a father of someone's parent.

Grandfather may also refer to:

== Arts and entertainment ==
=== Literature ===
- The Grandfather, a novel by Ellen Pickering
- "Grandfather" (poem), a poem by Nikolai Nekrasov

=== Film ===
- The Grandfather (1925 film) (El abuelo), Spanish silent film
- Grandfather (film), a 1939 French film directed by Robert Péguy
- The Grandfather (1954 film) (El abuelo), Argentine film
- The Grandfather (1998 film) (El abuelo), Spanish film
- El Abuelo (2017 film) (The Grandfather), a Peruvian-Colombian road comedy-drama film

=== TV ===
- "The Grandfather", a 1982 episode of Bosom Buddies
- "The Grandfather" (Gossip Girl), a 2009 episode of Gossip Girl

== Other uses ==
- Grandfather clause, also known as grandfathering
- Grandfather, North Carolina, USA
- Grandfather (boulder), sacred rock in Belarus

== See also ==
- Alerce Milenario, the tree known as "Great-Grandfather"
- El abuelo (disambiguation) (Spanish: Grandfather)
- Grandmother (disambiguation)
- Grand (disambiguation)
- Father (disambiguation)
