= Abuela =

Abuela (Spanish: Grandmother) or Abuelas may refer to:

- Albillo or abuela, a white Spanish wine grape variety
- Cristina Calderón or "Abuela" (1928–2022), last native speaker of the Yaghan language
- Las abuelas, a 1965 Mexican telenovela
- The Grandmother (1981 film) (Spanish: La abuela), a Colombian drama film
- The Grandmother (2021 film) (Spanish: La abuela), a Spanish-French horror film
- "La abuela", a 1945 article by Teodoro Núñez Ureta for which he won the National Journalism Award of Peru
- Abuela, a 1991 book by Arthur Dorros
- La abuela, a 2006 book by Ariel Magnus
- Alma Madrigal, a character from Encanto

== See also ==
- El abuelo (disambiguation) (Spanish: Grandfather)
- Abuelita (disambiguation) (Spanish: granny, granma)
- Grandmother (disambiguation)
- Nana (disambiguation) (Spanish: grandmother)
- Abu (disambiguation) (Spanish: grandparent)
