= Abul =

Abul is an Arabic masculine given name. It may refer to:

- Abul Kalam Azad
- Abul A'la Maududi
- Abul Khair (disambiguation), several people
- Abul Abbas (disambiguation), several people
- Abul Hasan
- Abul Hasan Ali Hasani Nadwi
- Abu'l-Fazl ibn Mubarak
- Abul Hasan Qutb Shah
- Abul-Hasan Al-Muhajir
- Abul Farah Faridi, Bangladeshi academic
- Abul Kalam (disambiguation), several people
- Abul Kalam Azad, a photographer
- Abul Lais Siddiqui
- Abul Lais Islahi Nadvi
- Abul Hossain
- Abul Qasim Nomani
- Abul Maal Abdul Muhith
- Abul K. Abbas
- Abul Hayat, Bangladeshi actor

== See also ==
- Abul Kalam Mohammad (disambiguation), a compound given name
- Abul Aish, a village in Bahrain
- Avul Pakir Jainulabdeen Abdul Kalam (1931 – 2015), 11th President of India
- Abu (disambiguation)
- Abdul
- Apu (disambiguation)
