= Chaihuín River =

Coordinates: 39.96502°S 73.57063°W

- Native name: Río Chaihuín (Spanish)

Location
- Country: Chile

Physical characteristics
- Source
  - location: Cordillera Pelada
- Mouth
  - location: Chaihuín, Pacific Ocean
  - elevation: 0 m (0 ft)

Chaihuín River (Spanish: Río Chaihuín) is a river in Los Ríos Region, southern Chile. The hamlet of Chaihuín and Chaihuín Beach lies at the mouth of the river mouth as well as the administration of the Valdivian Coastal Reserve.

The river originates in the mountains of the Chilean Coast Range and runs through dense forest. It discharges into the Pacific Ocean through a shallow gap across a sand bar.
