= Colun =

Colun or Colún may refer to:

- Cooperativa Agrícola y Lechera de La Unión Limitada (COLUN or Colún), a Chilean dairy cooperative company
- Colún Beach, in Chile
- Colún River, in Chile
- Colun, a village in Porumbacu de Jos Commune, Sibiu County, Romania
