= Hueicomilla Airport =

Hueicomilla Airport Hueicolla Airport
- IATA: none; ICAO: SCHK

Summary
- Airport type: Public
- Location: Hueicolla, Chile
- Elevation AMSL: 59 ft / 18 m
- Coordinates: 40°09′35″S 73°39′11″W

Map
- Location of Hueicomilla Airport in Chile

Runways
Direction	Length		Surface
Direction	m	ft	Surface
14/32	564	1,850	Grass
- Source: GCM Landings.com Google Maps

Hueicomilla Airport Spanish: Aeropuerto Hueicomilla, (ICAO: SCHK) is an airstrip serving Hueicolla, a Pacific coastal settlement in the La Unión commune of Chile's Los Ríos Region.

The airstrip is in a shallow forested valley running inland within the Valdivian Coastal Reserve. The runway has an additional 135 metres (443 ft) of grass overrun on the south, which ends abruptly in a wooded hillside and rising terrain beyond. North approach and departure are over the ocean.

== See also ==
- Transport in Chile
- List of airports in Chile
