= The Moorish Queen =

The Moorish Queen (Spanish:La reina mora) may refer to:

- The Moorish Queen, a 1903 zarzuela by the Quintero brothers
  - The Moorish Queen (1922 film) a Spanish silent film adaptation
  - The Moorish Queen (1937 film) a Spanish film adaptation
  - The Moorish Queen (1955 film) a Spanish film adaptation
