= Alerce =

Alerce is the Spanish word for two unrelated trees Larix (larch) and Fitzroya, albeit the name was first applied to the larch.

- Alerce, Chile, a Chilean town
- Alerce Glacier
- Fitzroya cupressoides, a species of evergreen tree from South America, unrelated to the larch
- Alerce Costero National Park
- Alerce Andino National Park
- Alerce Prize, a Chilean literature award
- Los Alerces National Park
- Emepa Alerce, an Argentine train used on commuter rail services
- Alerce (wood type), the wood of the sandarac tree
- Alerce, la otra música, a Chilean record label
