= Papiliomyces australis =

Scientific classification
- Kingdom: Fungi
- Division: Ascomycota
- Class: Sordariomycetes
- Order: Hypocreales
- Family: Clavicipitaceae
- Genus: Papiliomyces
- Species: P. australis

Binomial name
- Papiliomyces australis Gallardo-Pill. & C.Montalva

Species of fungus

Papiliomyces australis
- Mycological characteristics

Papiliomyces australis is a species of fungus in the family Clavicipitaceae within the order Hypocreales, native to Chile.

== Taxonomy ==
The species was first described by Esteban Gallardo Pillancari and Cristian Montalva in 2026, based on specimens from Alerce Costero National Park. The holotype is deposited in Chilean National Museum of Natural History, under the catalog number SGO 172356.
