= La abuela =

La abuela may refer to:

- The Grandmother (1981 film)
- The Grandmother (2021 film)
