= Colún River =

Coordinates: 40.08359°S 73.64204°W

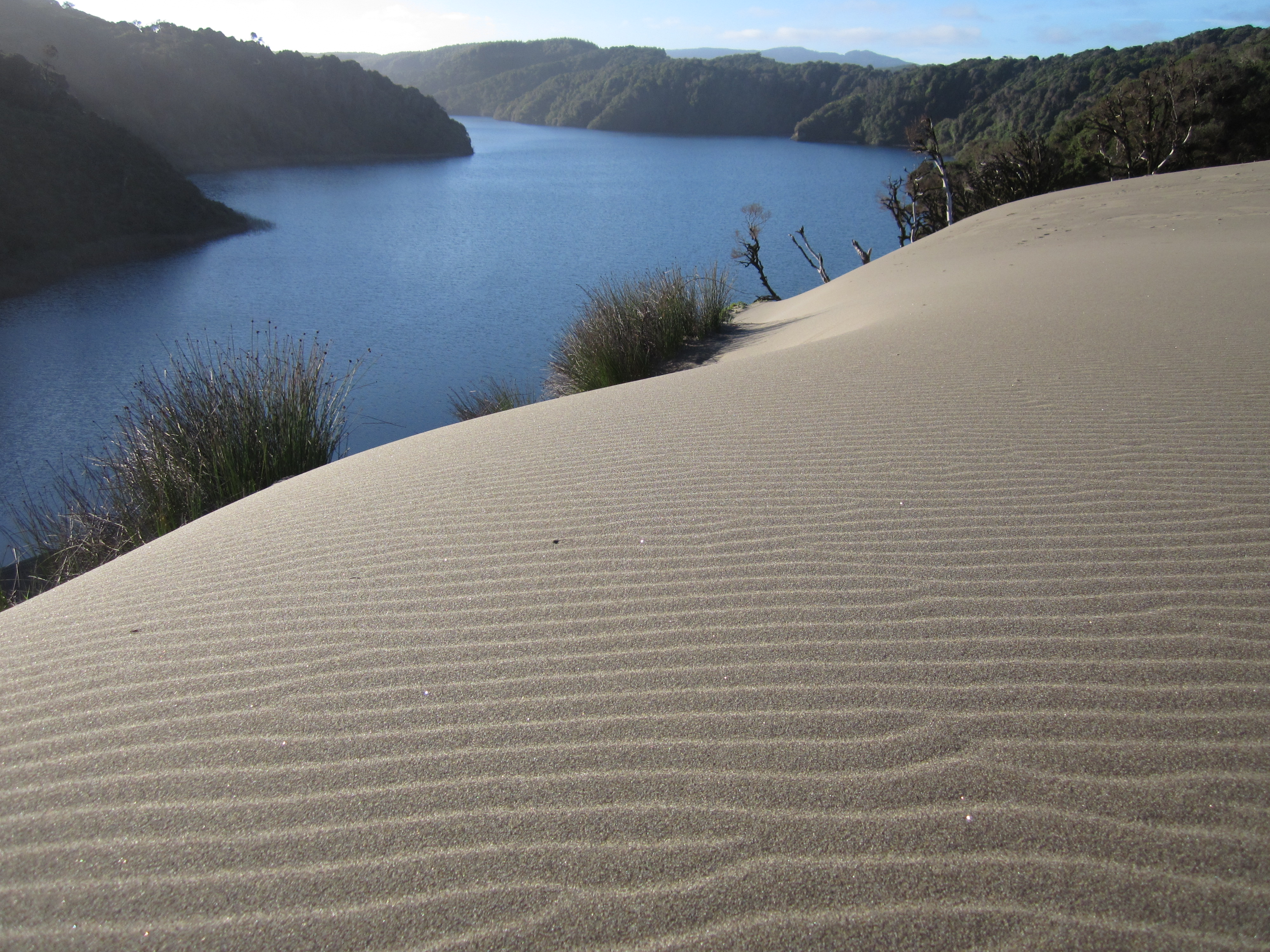
- Dunes and freshwater lagoon at Colún Beach

Location
- Country: Chile

Physical characteristics
- Source
  - location: Cordillera Pelada
- Mouth
  - location: Colún Beach
  - elevation: 0 m (0 ft)

Colún River is a river in La Unión, Chile It is fed by the Yugo Largo, Mañío and El Puente streams at the Colún Hill. The end of the river opens into the Pacific Ocean at Punta Colún, the Colún Beach inside the Valdivian Coastal Reserve.

== See also ==
- List of rivers of Chile
