= Beatriz de Lenclós =

Spanish actress (1923–2026)

- Born: Beatriz Ledesma Gorostiza; 4 August 1923; Vitoria-Gasteiz, Spain
- Died: 5 January 2026 (aged 102); Altea, Spain
- Occupations: Stage actress, dancer, singer
- Years active: 1940s–1950s

Beatriz Ledesma Gorostiza (4 August 1923 – 5 January 2026), known professionally as Beatriz de Lenclós, was a Spanish stage actress, dancer and singer from Vitoria-Gasteiz. She rose to prominence in magazine theatre and revue during the 1940s and 1950s. She later became associated with the normalization of the two-piece swimsuit in Spain after being photographed in a bikini on the beaches of Benidorm in 1955. In later life, she was locally regarded as the first Spanish actress to pose in the garment.

== Early life and education ==
Ledesma was born on 4 August 1923 in Vitoria-Gasteiz, in Spain's Basque Country. She came from a working background linked to the mining district of Gallarta Abanto and, as a teenager, undertook formal training in singing and dance at Madrid's Círculo de Bellas Artes. She pursued a stage career from an early age and, in the postwar years, moved into variety and magazine theatre.

== Career ==
By the early 1940s, Ledesma was working on Madrid stages and rose during the decade to the rank of first vedette in Spain's revista companies. She also made a screen appearance in 1943 linked to director José Buchs and the feature Un caballero famoso. A recording held by the Biblioteca Nacional de España documents her work as a singer around mid-century pairing her name with vocalist Jorge Sepúlveda on the Columbia release Risa y llanto and Sufrir dated circa 1950.

During the 1950s, Ledesma became part of Benidorm's beach and stage milieu and eventually settled in the city. In photographs taken on Levante Beach in 1955, she wore a bikini at a time when the two-piece swimsuit was still subject to official scrutiny elsewhere in Spain. The episode became part of local memory surrounding Benidorm's early tourism development. In 2018, the city commemorated the sixty-fifth anniversary of the garment’s authorization on its beaches with a gala explicitly recognizing Ledesma as the first Spanish actress photographed in a bikini and honoring her as a resident. Later historical analysis has cited Benidorm's 1950s experience, under mayor Pedro Zaragoza, as a key context for the bikini's introduction to Spain.

== Later life and death ==
In later life, she returned to Vitoria Gasteiz as guest of honor at the Teatro Principal centenary gala in December 2018. She died in Altea on 5 January 2026, at the age of 102.
