= Ab (Semitic) =

Word meaning "father" in Semitic languages

Ab or Av (related to Akkadian abu), sometimes Abba, means "father" in most Semitic and Afroasiatic languages.

== Arabic ==
’Ab (أَب), from a theoretical, abstract form (آبَاءٌ ʼabaʼun) (triliteral ʼ-b-w) is Arabic for "father". The dual is (أَبَوَانِ ʼabawāni) or (أَبَانِ ʼabāni) "two fathers" or "mother and father" (آبَاءِكَ ʼābāʼi-ka meaning "thy parents").

Li-llāhi ʼabū-ka (للهِ أَبُوكَ) is an expression of praise, meaning "to God is attributable [the excellence of] your father".

As a verb, ʼ-b-w means "to become [as] a father to [somebody]" (أَبَوْتُه ʼabawt-uh, "paternity") or "to adopt [him] as a father" (تأَبَّبَهُ ta'abbaba-hu or اِسْتَأَبَّهُ ista'aba-hu).

In the construct state, Abū (أبو) is followed by another word to form a complete name, e.g.: Abu Mazen, another name for Mahmoud Abbas.

Abu may be used as a kunya, an honorific. To refer to a man by his fatherhood (of male offspring) is polite, so that ʼabū takes the function of an honorific. Even a man who is as yet childless may still be known as abū of his father's name, implying that he will yet have a son called after his father.

The combination is extended beyond the literal sense: a man may be described as acting as a father in his relation to animals, e.g., Abu Bakr, "the father of a camel's foal"; Abu Huraira, "father of kittens". In some cases, a man's enemies will refer to him in such a way to besmirch him, e.g. Abu Jahl, "the father of ignorance". A man may be described as being the possessor of some quality, as Abu'l Na'ama "father of grace", or "the graceful one"; Abu'l Fida, "father of devotion", or "the devout one". An object or a place may be given a nickname, such as Abu'l hawl, "father of terror", (the Sphinx at Giza). Abu'l fulus, "father of money", is frequently used to refer to a place where rumors have been told of a treasure being hidden there.

The Swahili word Bwana, meaning "mister", "sir", or "lord", is derived from the Arabic Abuna (أبونا), "our father".

== Aramaic ==
The Aramaic term for father is אב (av), but when speaking to someone (equivalent to the vocative in Latin), it is אבא (abba), which is how it appears transliterated in the New Testament in Mark 14:36, Romans 8:15 and Galatians 4:6.

=== Judaism ===
The Aramaic term abba (אבא, Hebrew: אב (av), "father") appears in traditional Jewish liturgy and Jewish prayers to God, e.g. in the Kaddish (קדיש, Qaddish Aramaic, Hebrew: קדש (Qādash), "holy").

The Pirkei Avot (Hebrew: פרקי אבות "Chapters of the Fathers") are a Mishnaic tractate of Avot, the second-to-last tractate in the order of Nezikin in the Talmud. The tractate of Pirkei Avot deals with ethical and moral principles.

Abba is a common given name in the Talmud. It is also used there as a title or honorific for religious scholars or leaders.

=== Christendom ===
A transliteration of the Aramaic term abba also appears three times in the Greek New Testament of the Bible. Each time the term appears in transliteration it is followed immediately by the translation ho pater in Greek, which literally means “the father.” In each case it is used with reference to God. Mark records that Jesus used the term when praying in Gethsemane shortly before his death, saying: “Abba, Father, all things are possible to you; remove this cup from me. Yet not what I want, but what you want.” (Mark 14:36) The two other occurrences are in Paul's letters, at Romans 8:15 and Galatians 4:6. It seems evident from these texts that, in apostolic times, the Christians made use of the term ’Abba in their prayers to God.

Early Christian Desert Fathers are referred to as abba: Abba Anthony, Abba Macarius. In Oriental Orthodoxy some high ranking bishop titles derive from Abba (Aboona, Abuna), as does the monastic title abbot in Western Christianity.

Some Christian literature translates abba to "daddy", suggesting that it is a childlike, intimate term for one's father. However, abba is used by adult children as well as young children, and in the time of Jesus it was neither markedly a term of endearment nor a formal word. Scholars suggest instead translating it as "Papa", as the word normally used by sons and daughters, throughout their lives, in the family context.

The name Barabbas in the New Testament comes from the Aramaic phrase Bar Abba meaning "son of the father".

== Hebrew ==
Av (Hebrew: אָב, Standard Av Tiberian ʾĀḇ Aramaic אבא Abba; related to Akkadian abu; "father"; plural: Hebrew: אבות Avot or Abot) means "father" in Hebrew. The exact meaning of the element ab (אב) or abi (אבי) in Hebrew personal names (such as Ab-ram, Ab-i-ram, Ah-ab, Jo-ab) is a matter of dispute. The identity of the -i- with the first person pronominal suffix (as in Adona-i), changing "father" to "my father", is uncertain; it might also be simply a connecting vowel. The compound may either express a nominal phrase (Av[i]ram = "[my] father is exalted") or simply an apposition. In the case of an apposition the second word would require a definite article (Av[i] hasafa = "father of the language", Ha= the). The word generally used today for "father" in Hebrew is abba, though ab survives in such archaisms as Abi Mori ("My father, my master") and Kibud av wa-em ("Honor of father and mother").

== Coptic ==
In the non-Semitic Coptic language, apa means father. It was originally used as a title of reverence for clergy and was later extended to martyrs. Many variants are known. The form apater or apa pater appears at the beginning of the Lord's Prayer. Anba and ampa are attested variants, often used in Arabic among Copts. In the Copto-Arabic Synaxarion, it is apou; in the Sayings of the Desert Fathers, it is abba or abbas. The feminine forms ama or amma are used for nuns.

== Somali ==
Father is translated aabbe or aabe, with the definite article form aabbaha or aabaha (the father).

== See also ==
- Abbot, Abbey
- Abu, Abul
- Abuna
- Aw
- Ben (Hebrew), a Hebrew particle meaning "son" used to form names
- Hebrew name
- Ibn, an Arabic particle meaning "son" used to form names
- Kunya
- Mama and papa
