= Grandmother (disambiguation) =

A grandmother is a mother of someone's parent.

Grandmother may also refer to:

- Grandmother (1922 film), a Czech drama film
- Grandmother (1940 film), a Czech drama film
- Grandmother (2009 film), a French-Filipino independent drama film
- The Grandmother (novella), a Czech novella by Božena Němcová
- The Grandmother (1970 film), a short film by David Lynch
- The Grandmother (1981 film), a Colombian drama film
- The Grandmother (2021 film), a Spanish-French horror film
- Grandmother, a fictional horror character from the 2018 Indian film Tumbbad

== See also ==
- abuela (disambiguation) (Spanish: Grandmother)
- abuelita (disambiguation) (Spanish: granny, granma
- Grandfather (disambiguation)
- Granny
