= Valdivian Coastal Reserve =

Natural reserve in the Cordillera Pelada

- Reserva Costera Valdiviana
- IUCN category III (natural monument or feature)
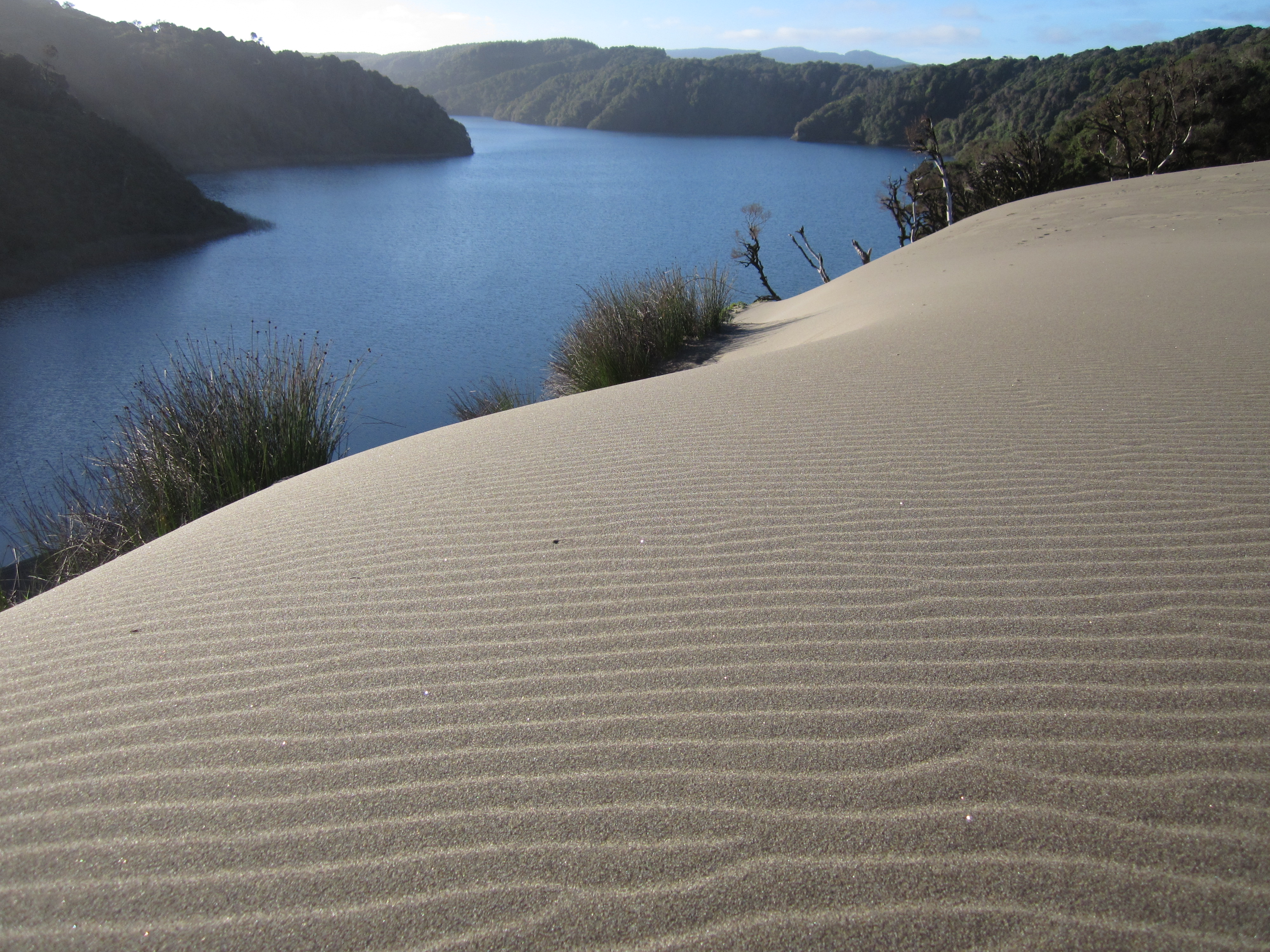
- Dunes and freshwater lagoon at Colún Beach
- Interactive map of Valdivian Coastal Reserve
- Location: Los Ríos Region, Chile
- Nearest city: Valdivia
- Coordinates: 40°11′0″S 73°28′0″W
- Area: 597 km^{2} (231 sq mi)
- Established: 2005 (property acquired in 2003)
- Governing body: The Nature Conservancy

Valdivian Coastal Reserve is a natural reserve located in the Cordillera Pelada, in Los Ríos Region of Chile, near Corral.

== History ==
In 2003, the WWF Chile program, The Nature Conservancy (TNC) and other local organizations acquired a nearly 60,000 hectare property 597 km^{2} (231 sq mi) that had been the subject of intensive forest controversies in the 1990s and early 2000s due to the conversion of native forests to eucalyptus plantations grown for paper pulp. The Valdivian Coastal Reserve was inaugurated on 22 March 2005. A further 10,000 hectares were donated to the Chilean state in 2012 in order to create the new Coastal Alerce National Park according to the plans laid out by the reserve's founding organizations in coordination with the National Forestry Corporation (CONAF for its Spanish acronym). It is now the largest protected area in the Chilean Coast Range.

== Management and services ==
The reserve headquarters is located in the village of Chaihuin. Most of the area originally acquired (50,000 hectares) is managed as a private reserve by TNC. The reserve is open to the public, and includes demonstration trails, various tourism opportunities run by local communities, and beaches that are highly visited in the summer time. The reserve also hosts a large number of scientific research and educational projects, serving as one of the region's focal points for ecological research and conservation. However, its protected status remains informal nearly a decade after the reserve was established because Chile does not yet have a legal framework for private protected areas. Moreover, the reserve's permanent management arrangement is unsettled, and it remains threatened by government plans to continue building the Southern Coastal Highway which would greatly impact the Colun and Rio Bueno areas. Earlier highway construction by the Ministry of Public Works and Military's Corps of Engineers in the mid-2000s opened a penetration route through the reserve and caused severe impacts to the Colun River estuary due to a botched (and later abandoned) attempt at a river crossing.

Eighty-three percent of the reserve is categorized as Valdivian temperate rainforest and 7.8% had previously been cleared, burned and planted with eucalyptus plantations. Some native forest types in the reserve includes olivillo Aextoxicon punctatum that forms dense forests near the coast and alerce Fitzroya cupressoides that grows at the higher elevations. The 9 km long Colún Beach and the Twin Lagoons of Colún lies inside the reserve just some kilometers north of Colún River. The lower flow of Bueno River makes up the southern boundary of the reserve. The reserve has 36 km of coastline including beaches, rocky shores and significant estuaries. Most of this coastline currently falls within Benthic Marine Management Areas owned and managed by local fishing associations. Extensive collaboration between the reserve, local NGOs and fishing associations has yielded a pilot cooperative management agreement to study and work to recover benthic resources in one of these areas.

Neighbors to the reserve include the Huilliche indigenous community of Huiro located on the coast south of Chaihuin. The community offers a number of ecotourism services during the summer period.

== See also ==
- Área Costera Protegida Punta Curiñanco
- Oncol Park

== Notes and references ==
- Bonello, Jenna (22 March 2005). "Inauguration Opens Nearly 150,000 Acres of Protected Chilean Rainforest to the Public for First Time" (Press release). World Wildlife Federation.
