= Guape =

- Interactive map of Guape
- Coordinates: 39°55′26″S 73°32′03″W
- Region: Los Ríos
- Province: Valdivia
- Municipality: Corral
- Commune: Corral

Government
  - Type: Municipal
- Elevation: 10 m (33 ft)

Population (2017)
  - Total: 224

Sex
  - Men: 108
  - Women: 116
- Time zone: UTC−04:00 (Chilean Standard)
  - Summer (DST): UTC−03:00 (Chilean Daylight)
- Area code: Country + town = 56 + 64

Guape is a hamlet (Spanish: caserío) located on the coast, between Caleta Chaihuín and the port of Corral in Valdivia Province, southern Chile. In 2017 Guape had a population of 224 inhabitants up from 100 in 2002.
