= Hueicolla =

- Costal rocks at Hueicolla Beach
- Interactive map of Hueicolla
- Coordinates: 40°09′38″S 73°39′55″W
- Region: Los Ríos
- Province: Ranco
- Municipality: La Unión
- Commune: La Unión

Government
  - Type: Municipal
  - Alcade: María Angélica Astudillo Mautz (PPD)
- Elevation: 5 m (16 ft)

Population (2002 census )
  - Total: 39
- Time zone: UTC−04:00 (Chilean Standard)
  - Summer (DST): UTC−03:00 (Chilean Daylight)
- Area code: Country + town = 56 + 63

Hueicolla is a beach and hamlet (Spanish: caserío) at the sparsely populated coast of La Unión commune, southern Chile. Hueicolla is located south of Colún Beach, west of Alerce Costero National Park and Cordillera Pelada and north of the mouth of Bueno River.
