= A Famous Gentleman =

- Directed by: José Buchs
- Written by: Matías Cirici Ventalló; Juan López Núñez; José Buchs
- Starring: Amparo Rivelles; Alfredo Mayo
- Cinematography: Emilio Foriscot
- Edited by: Antonio Cánovas
- Music by: José Forns
- Production company: CIFESA
- Distributed by: CIFESA
- Release date: 1 January 1943
- Running time: 98 minutes
- Country: Spain
- Language: Spanish

A Famous Gentleman (Spanish:Un caballero famoso) is a 1943 Spanish drama film directed by José Buchs and starring Amparo Rivelles and Alfredo Mayo. The film is set in the world of bullfighting.

== Plot ==
When well-bred Rafael meets beautiful but inconstant Eugenia he is fascinated to the point of even becoming a torero to please her wish for fame.

== Cast ==
- Amparo Rivelles
- Alfredo Mayo
- Tomás Blanco
- Florencia Bécquer
- Manolo Caracol
- Antonio Casas
- Juan Cortés
- Roberto Lampaya
- Joaquina Maroto
- Manolita Morán
- Miguel Pozanco
- Alberto Romea
- Jacinto San Emeterio

== Bibliography ==
- Bentley, Bernard. A Companion to Spanish Cinema. Boydell & Brewer 2008.
