= Poor Valbuena =

1923 film

- Directed by: José Buchs
- Written by: Carlos Arniches (play); Enrique García Álvarez (play); José Buchs
- Produced by: Óscar Hornemann
- Cinematography: José María Maristany
- Production company: Film Española
- Release date: 1923
- Country: Spain
- Languages: Silent; Spanish intertitles

Poor Valbuena (Spanish:El pobre Valbuena) is a 1923 Spanish silent film directed by José Buchs. It is based on a popular zarzuela of the same title.

== Cast ==
- Alfonso Aguilar
- María Anaya
- Carmen Andrés
- María Comendador
- Antonio Gil Varela 'Varillas'
- Ana de Leyva
- Celso Lucio
- José Montenegro
- Manuel San Germán

== Production ==
The film was said to be one of the sainetes made by Buchs in which he showed his understanding of the commercial potential of costumbrismo in film.

== Bibliography ==
- Mira, Alberto. The A to Z of Spanish Cinema. Rowman & Littlefield, 2010.
