= Diego Corrientes (1924 film) =

1924 film

- Directed by: José Buchs
- Written by: José Buchs
- Cinematography: José María Maristany
- Production company: Film Española
- Release date: 17 November 1924
- Country: Spain
- Languages: Silent; Spanish intertitles

Diego Corrientes is a 1924 Spanish silent historical film directed by José Buchs. It portrays the life of the eighteenth century highwaymen Diego Corrientes Mateos.

== Cast ==
- María Anaya
- Celia Escudero as María
- José Montenegro as Tío Petaca
- Enriqueta Palma
- Modesto Rivas as Don Mateo Sanabria
- José Romeu as Diego Corrientes
- José Valle as El Renegao

== Bibliography ==
- de España, Rafael. Directory of Spanish and Portuguese film-makers and films. Greenwood Press, 1994.
