= Punta Galera =

- Headland
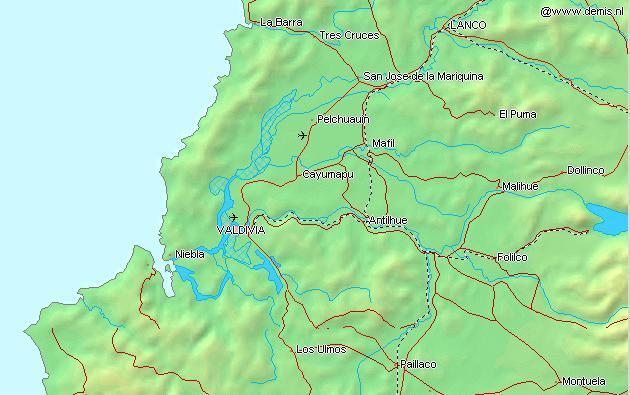
- Punta Galera, the westernmost projection of the coastline
- Coordinates: 40°00′S 73°25′W
- Location: Los Ríos Region, Chile
- Water bodies: Pacific Ocean

Punta Galera is a headland in the western coast of South America located in Los Ríos Region, Chile. The headland projects into the Pacific Ocean at the 40th parallel south just north of Colún Beach and south of Caleta Chaihuín. Punta Galera should not be confused with Falsa Punta Galera a minor headland located a few kilometers northeast of it. Punta Galera is the site of a lighthouse since 1875.

The headland was noticed in the expedition of Juan Bautista Pastene in 1544, but the Spanish name of Punta Galera was given by the explorer Juan Ladrillero in 1557 who thought it resembled the ram of a galley (Spanish: galera). Local Mapuche called the headland vuchuchén, meaning "place of travellers". Diccionario Geográfico de la República de Chile mentions Punta Galera as the site of the wreckage of San José in 1651.

== See also ==
- Lighthouses in Chile
- Punta Galera Airport
