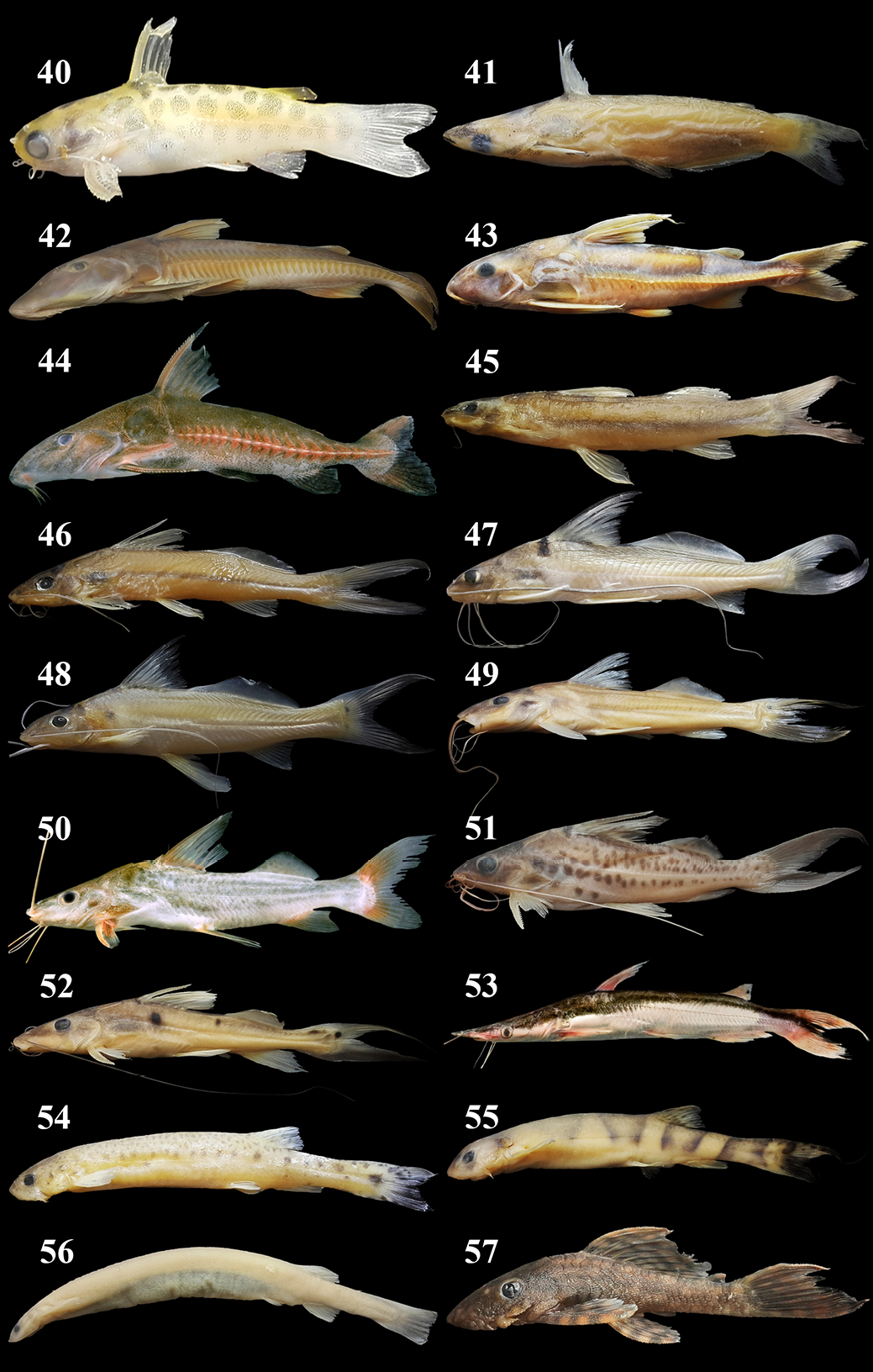
- Cheirocerus eques at fig N0. 47

Scientific classification
- Kingdom: Animalia
- Phylum: Chordata
- Class: Actinopterygii
- Order: Siluriformes
- Family: Pimelodidae
- Genus: Cheirocerus; C. H. Eigenmann, 1917

Type species
- Cheirocerus eques Eigenmann 1917

Synonyms
- Sovichthys; Schultz, 1944

= Cheirocerus =

Genus of fishes

Cheirocerus is a genus of long-whiskered catfishes native to South America.

== Species ==
There are currently three recognized species in this genus:

- Cheirocerus abuelo (Schultz, 1944)
- Cheirocerus eques C. H. Eigenmann, 1917
- Cheirocerus goeldii (Steindachner, 1908)

== Distribution and habitat ==
Cheirocerus is distributed throughout much of the Amazon River basin, and appear to be absent from the Orinoco River. C. abuelo occurs in the Lake Maracaibo basin, C. eques in the Amazon River basin, and C. goeldii in the Purus River basin.

C. goeldii is more typical of lowland large rivers where the water may be warmer and deeper, though it may also occur far upstream. C. eques appears to occur closer to Andean foothills where rivers may be cooler and shallower.

== Description ==
Species of Cheirocerus have a fully ventral mouth with relatively fleshy lips, a broad premaxilla, a crimped gas bladder that appears to have fringe or finger-like projections, and the slender hollow tube extensions on each side of the gas bladder. These fish have an undeveloped dorsal fin locking mechanism and no dorsal fin spine. They also have a relatively long adipose fin. These species all have three pairs of barbels. C. eques and C. goeldii display some geographic variations in certain morphometric characteristics.

C. abuelo has a dusky-gray body colouration that varies from relatively plain to having numerous small brown spots, and usually has a broad, diffuse band crossing the nape at the dorsal fin origin. Both C. goeldii and C. eques have a relatively uniform body colouration without spots; C. goeldii has a small, triangular spot at the dorsal fin origin, while C. eques has a distinct dark band at the dorsal fin origin.

C. abuelo appears to attain the largest size of the three species, reaching at least 22 centimetres (8.7 in). By contrast, the largest known C. eques is about 14 centimetres (5.5 in) and the largest C. goeldii is about 15 centimetres (5.9 in).

== Ecology ==
Cheirocerus species are generally nocturnal. This is evidenced by the specialized gas bladder, hypothesized to enhance hearing, and the poorly developed pigmentation.

Diet mostly consists of benthic invertebrates, with chironomid larvae being a dominant component, but also including ostracods and mayfly nymphs.
