= Cheirocerus eques =

Conservation status
- Least Concern (IUCN 3.1)

Scientific classification
- Kingdom: Animalia
- Phylum: Chordata
- Class: Actinopterygii
- Order: Siluriformes
- Family: Pimelodidae
- Genus: Cheirocerus
- Species: C. eques

Binomial name
- Cheirocerus eques Eigenmann, 1917

Species of fish

Cheirocerus eques, is a species of demersal catfish of the family Pimelodidae that is native to Amazon River basin of Brazil.

It grows to a length of 18 cm (7.1 in). It inhabits fresh water rivers in rio Canoas and its tributaries in Santa Catarina, Brazil.

It is clearly distinguished from other species with 17-21 gill rakers. It feeds primarily on benthic invertebrates.
