= Abuelita (disambiguation) =

Abuelita (Spanish: granny, grandmother) may refer to:

- Abuelita (brand), a Mexican brand of hot chocolate
- La abuelita (film), a 1942 Mexican film
- Abuelita, a fictional character from the 2000 young adult novel Esperanza Rising
- Abuelita Yolie, a fictional character from the Sprout animated series Nina's World
- Abuelita Salamanca, a fictional character from television series Better Call Saul.
- Mi Abuelita (painting; Spanish: My Granma), a mural by Judy Baca
- "Abuelita" (song), a 2000 song by Richard Shindell off the album Somewhere Near Paterson

== See also ==
- Castianeira abuelita (C. abuelita), a species of insect
- Abuela (disambiguation) (Spanish: grandmother)
- Nana (disambiguation) (Spanish: grandmother)
- Abu (disambiguation) (Spanish: grandparent)
- Grandmother (disambiguation)
