= The Moorish Queen (1955 film) =

- Directed by: Raúl Alfonso
- Written by: Serafín Álvarez Quintero (play); Joaquín Álvarez Quintero (play); Raúl Alfonso; Francisco Naranjo; Camilo Murillo; José María Ochoa
- Produced by: Juan N. Solórzano
- Starring: Antoñita Moreno; Pepe Marchena; Miguel Ligero
- Cinematography: Aldo Giordani
- Edited by: Antonio Gimeno; Mercedes Gimeno
- Music by: José Serrano
- Production company: Cervantes Films
- Release date: 31 January 1955
- Running time: 87 minutes
- Country: Spain
- Language: Spanish

The Moorish Queen (Spanish:La reina mora) is a 1955 Spanish musical film directed by Raúl Alfonso and starring Antoñita Moreno, Pepe Marchena and Miguel Ligero. It is based on a zarzuela which had previously been made into a 1922 silent film and a 1937 sound film.

It was shot in Ferraniacolor.

== Synopsis ==
During the April Fair in Seville, Esteban wounds his rival Antonio in a fight. Coral, Esteban's girlfriend, asks Cotufo, her brother, to change their address, since she wants to live in isolation while her boyfriend remains in jail. Cotufo agrees and both brothers move to a mansion where, according to legend, a Christian and the daughter of a Moorish king lived three hundred years ago. She died of love sorrow and the legend adds that a goblin has lived in the house since then.

== Cast ==
- Antoñita Moreno as Coral
- Pepe Marchena as Esteban
- Miguel Ligero as Pepe
- Antonio Riquelme as Don Nué
- Casimiro Hurtado as Juan Bizcocho
- Juanita Azores as Mercedes
- Conchita Bautista as Laura
- Antonio Vega as Cotufa
- Julia Delgado Caro as Doña Juana
- Rosario Royo as Manuela
- Manuel Guitián as Miguel Ángel
- Emilio Segura as Antonio
- Xan das Bolas as Presidiario
- José Cepero
- Matilde Guarnerio
- Laura Alcoriza
- Mateo Guitart
- José Domínguez Luna
- Elena Riquelme
- Victoria Argota
- Carmen de la Vega
- Armando Lirio
- Concha Velasco as Bailaora

== Bibliography ==
- D'Lugo, Marvin. Guide to the Cinema of Spain. Greenwood Publishing, 1997.
