= Cheirocerus goeldii =

Conservation status
- Least Concern (IUCN 3.1)

Scientific classification
- Kingdom: Animalia
- Phylum: Chordata
- Class: Actinopterygii
- Order: Siluriformes
- Family: Pimelodidae
- Genus: Cheirocerus
- Species: C. goeldii

Binomial name
- Cheirocerus goeldii (Steindachner, 1908)

Synonyms
- Cheirocerus leptus; Pimelodina goeldii

Species of fish

Cheirocerus goeldii, is a species of demersal catfish of the family Pimelodidae that is native to Purus River basin and Das Velhas River basin of Brazil and Peru.

It grows to a length of 15.2 cm (6.0 in).
