= Abu =

Abu or ABU may refer to:

== Arts and media ==
- Abu, character in a series of animated anti-fascist propaganda short films produced by Halas & Batchelor for the British Ministry of Information from 1943 to 1945
- A character in the Disney Aladdin franchise
- Abu Usman, fictional ISIS terrorist in the 2017 Indian film Tiger Zinda Hai, portrayed by Sajjad Delafrooz

== Businesses and organizations ==
- ABU Garcia, a Swedish producer of sport fishing equipment
- African Boxing Union, African boxing organization which awards continental titles
- Ahmadu Bello University, Zaria
- Asia-Pacific Broadcasting Union
- ABUniverse, a seller of adult diapers

== People ==
- Abu (Arabic term), a kunya when written in the construct state
- Ab (Semitic), a common part of Arabic-derived names, meaning "father of" in Arabic
- Abu al-Faraj (disambiguation)
- Abu Baker Asvat, a murdered South African activist and medical doctor
- Abu Ibrahim (disambiguation)
- Abu Kigab (born 1998), Canadian basketballer
- Abu Mohammed (disambiguation)
- Abu Salim (disambiguation)
- Abdul-Malik Abu (born 1995), American basketball player
- Raneo Abu, Filipino politician

== Places ==
- Abu (volcano), a volcano on the island of Honshū in Japan
- Abu, Yamaguchi, a town in Japan
- Ahmadu Bello University, a university located in Zaria, Nigeria
- Atlantic Baptist University, a Christian university located in Moncton, New Brunswick, Canada
- Elephantine, Egypt, known as Abu to the Ancient Egyptians
- Abu Road, in Rajasthan, India
- Mount Abu, the highest mountain in the Indian state of Rajasthan, also a hill station
- A. A. Bere Tallo Airport in Atambua, Province of East Nusa Tenggara, Indonesia (IATA airport code ABU)

== Other uses ==
- Abu (god), a minor god of vegetation in Sumerian mythology
- Abu language (disambiguation)
- Abure language (ISO 639: ABU), a Tano language of Ivory Coast
- Airman Battle Uniform, a utility uniform of the United States Air Force
- Asymptomatic bacteriuria, bacteria in the urine without signs of a urinary tract infection
- The fifth month of the Babylonian calendar
- ABU, a name used for the Latin American Atlantic trio of Argentina, Brazil and Uruguay

== See also ==
- Apu (disambiguation)
- A Bu, Chinese jazz pianist, born as Dai Liang
