= Aldo Giordani =

Italian cinematographer (1914–1992)

- Born: 2 November 1914; Rome, Italy
- Died: 1982 (aged 67–68); Rome, Italy
- Occupation: Cinematographer
- Years active: 1937-1977 (film)

Aldo Giordani (2 November 1914 – 1982) was an Italian cinematographer.

He was born in Rome and died there in 1982.

== Selected filmography ==
- Apparition (1943)
- Night Taxi (1950)
- Welcome, Reverend! (1950)
- The Force of Destiny (1950)
- The King's Mail (1951)
- Beauties in Capri (1952)
- Too Bad She's Bad (1954)
- The Moorish Queen (1955)
- The Two Friends (1955)
- A Woman Alone (1956)
- Engaged to Death (1957)
- The Mongols (1961)
- Desert Raiders (1964)
- El Rojo (1966)
- A Sword for Brando (1970)
- Amuck! (1972)
- Due sul pianerottolo (1976)

== Bibliography ==
- Peter Cowie & Derek Elley. World Filmography: 1967. Fairleigh Dickinson University Press, 1977.
