= Alerce Costero National Park =

National park in Chile

- IUCN category III (natural monument or feature)
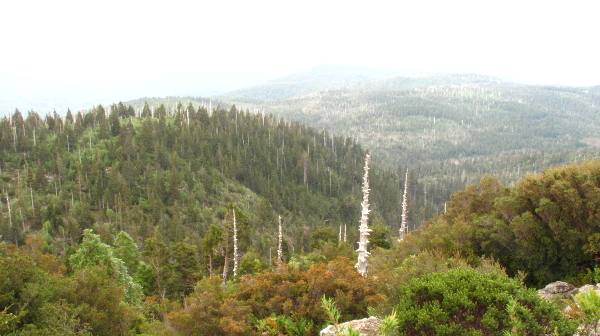

- Location within Chile
- Location: La Unión, Chile commune, Los Ríos Region, Chile
- Nearest city: La Unión, Chile
- Coordinates: 40°11′0″S 73°28′0″W
- Area: 139.75 km^{2} (53.96 sq mi)
- Established: 1987 National Reserve, 2010 National Park
- Governing body: Corporación Nacional Forestal

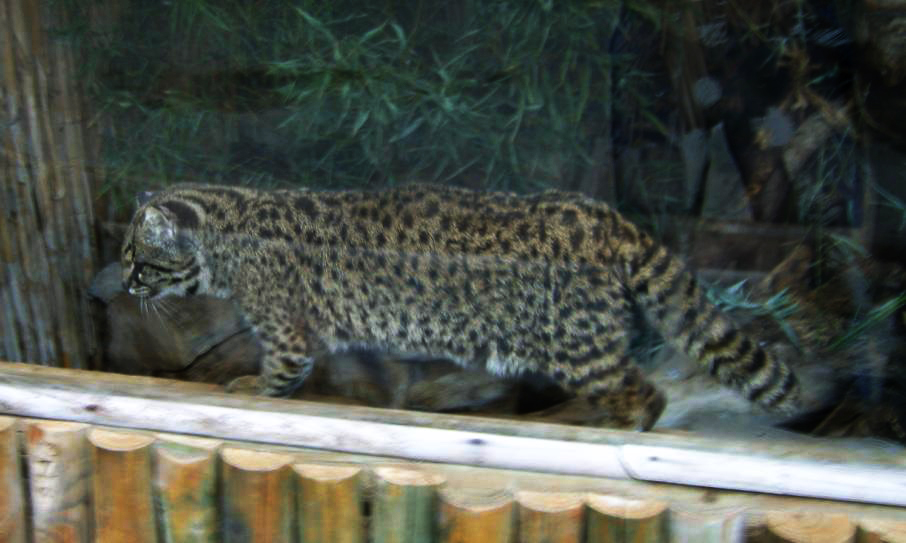
Kodkod.

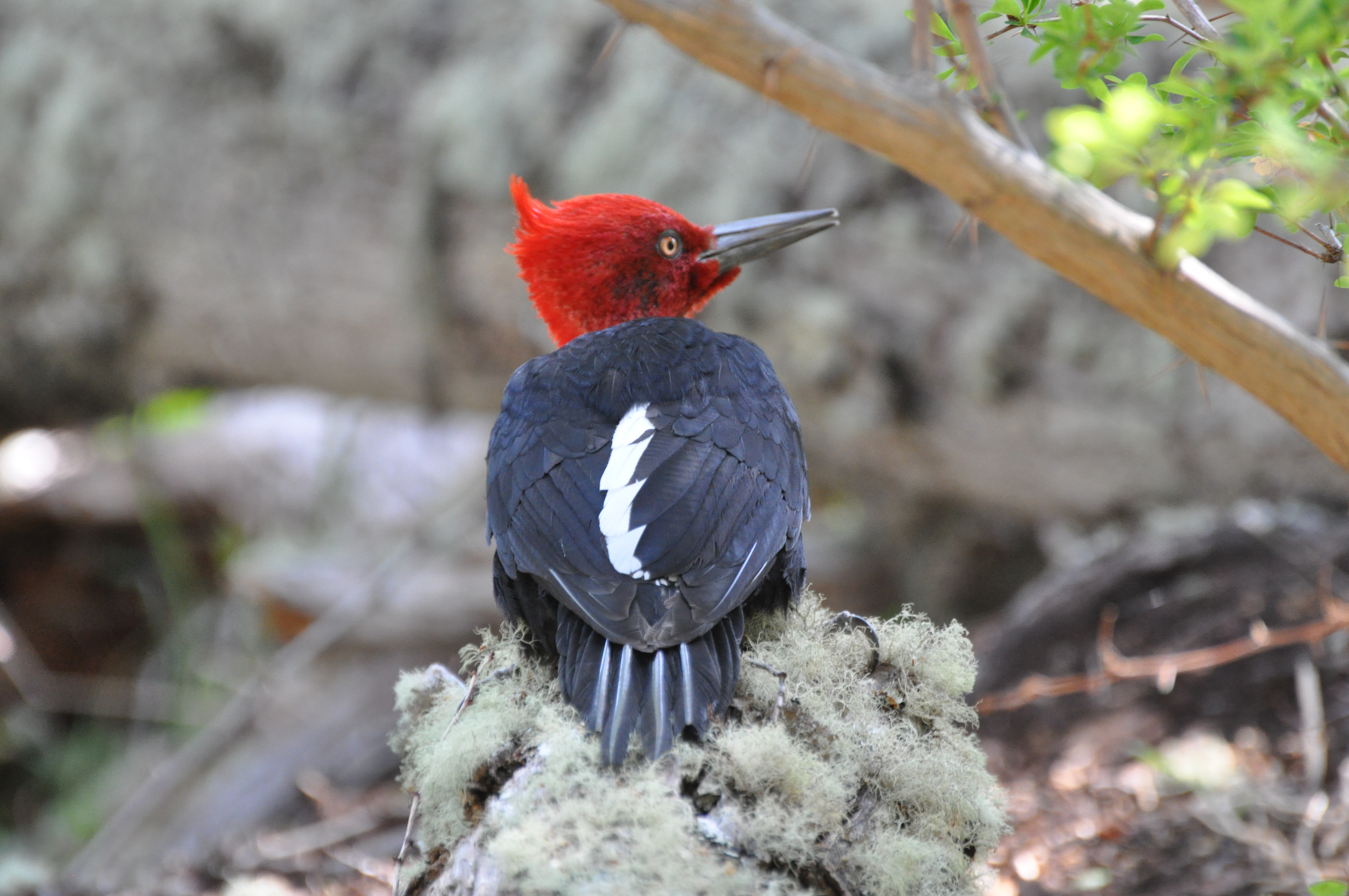
Black or Magellanic woodpecker

Alerce Costero National Park (Spanish: Parque Nacional Alerce Costero, Latin American Spanish: [aˈleɾse kosˈteɾo]) is a protected wild area in the Cordillera Pelada about 137 km (85 miles) from Valdivia and 49 km (30 miles) from La Unión. Fitzroya trees grow inside the protected area and give the area its name, with Alerce Costero translating as Coastal Fitzroya. The Natural Monument has a total area of 137 hectares (340 acres).

== History ==
Alerce Costero National Park has its origins in the National Monument Alerce Costero, created on January 3, 1987, by the Chilean government. In 2010 the area was elevated to national park status and was renamed Alerce Costero National Park (Spanish: Parque Nacional Alerce Costero). The new national park is the result of a public-private collaboration that united the state-owned Alerce Costero National Monument, Valdivia National Reserve and Quitaluto estate with land donated by The Nature Conservancy, which also owns the adjacent Valdivian Coastal Reserve.

== Details ==
The park is administered by CONAF (the Chilean National Forest Corporation), has a total surface area of 137 square kilometres (53 square miles), and rises to a maximum elevation of 1,048 m (3,438 feet). The geography of the park make it suitable for many species of endemic birds and mammals with very specific habitat requirement. One of the goals of the park is to protect the Valdivian temperate rain forest and help maintain Chaihuín river basin, an important watercourse in the region, while also protecting the Chaihuín community that depend on the river. The unique ecosystem of the southern Chilean Coast Range and Valdivian temperate rain forest makes this a priority site for biodiversity conservation. The mountainous area served as a refuge from the devastating effects of the last glaciation which occurred during the Quaternary Period, and more recently from the effects of volcanic activity. It has not, however, been kept safe human activity and is today classes as a threatened area.

From about 1750 to 1943, when the land between Maullín River and Valdivia was colonized by Spain and then Chile, numerous fires of Fitzroya woods occurred in Cordillera Pelada. These fires were initiated by Spaniards, Chileans and Europeans. Earlier, from 1397 to 1750 the Fitzroya woods of Cordillera Pelada also suffered from fires that originated from lightning strikes and indigenous inhabitants.

== Climate ==
The area of Valdivia and the Los Ríos Region has a rainy temperate climate, with rains all year round. The park is slightly warmer than the rest of the region, with an average annual temperature of 12° Celsius and temperatures ranging from being 17.2 °C (63 °F) in January and the 7.6 °C (45.7 °F) in July.

== Location and access ==
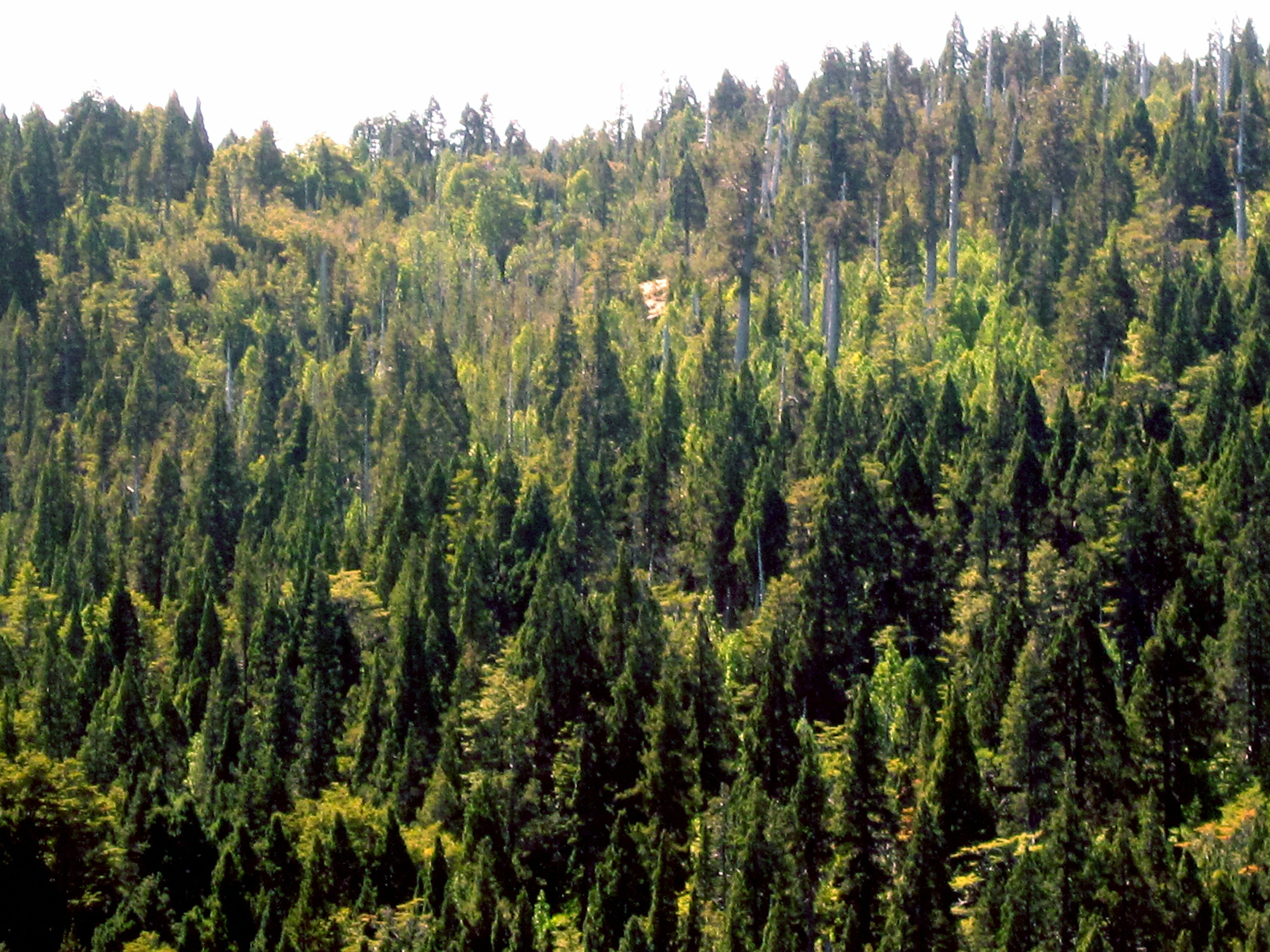
Fitzroya forest at Alerce Costero National Park, Chile.

The park is part of the Valdivian temperate rain forest, and located in the Coastal Range of the communes of Corral and La Unión. There are works in progress to improve access to the park but the use of four wheel drive vehicles is currently recommended.

Access from Corral

The main access is route T-80 that runs from Corral to the seaside village of Hueicolla. The road consists of 31 km (19 miles) of gravel and 17 km (11 miles) of dirt road, suitable only for off-road vehicles or mountain bikes. There is an alternative route for standard vehicles via the road joining La Unión and Santa Elisa in the Cumleufu area. Other ways of accessing the park from Corral (all suitable for four wheel drives and mountain bikes only) include:

- 1C Access: West entrance, approaching from the town of Chaihuín in Corral commune, towards the Catrileufu zone that used to be part of the former Valdivia National Reserve.
- 2C Access: North entrance from Corral, following route T- 470, to the Quitaluto-Catrilelfu zone.
- 3C Access: North entrance from the town of Morro Gonzalo Corral in the commune of the Quitaluto.
- 4C Access: Entrance from route T-60 via the Valdivia – La Union Highway (Route T -640) in the Tres Chiflones zone, toward La Romaza by a dirt road.

Accesses from La Unión

- 1U access: South entrance from the town of Santa Elisa in the commune of La Unión to the La Romaza area,. The road is in good condition and suitable for all vehicles.
- 2U Access: Entrance via route T-80 from La Unión to the Alto Mirador area. The gravel road is in good condition and is suitable for all vehicles.

There is also a river access from the Chaihuín river and a 60-kilometre (37-mile) four wheel drive route that runs from the coast via route T-470 to Hueicolla, and from there to route T-80.

=== Main features and activities ===
Entry to the park is free, and it is open daily from 9:00 to 20:00. As its name suggests, one of the main features of the park are the ancient Fitzroya trees, some of which are thousands of years old, especially in the southern area of the park. The evergreen forest has burnt out patches where forest fires have left their mark, which have given the area its alternative name: "Cordillera Pelada" or "Bald Mountains".

The park is suitable for hiking and horseback riding, and has several viewpoints and places to observe the flora, fauna and landscapes. The park is a particularly popular site for mountain biking. In the north area (Catrilelfu, Las Romazas) there is a CONAF office with park rangers, tourist information and safety advice. Toilets and trash cans are located around the park. The park has two short official trail routes, both located in the southern part, although more than 100 km (62 miles) of further trails are being explored and equipped for visitors.

- The 1,800 "Alerce Milenario" (Ancient Fitzroya) route leads to a 3,000-year-old, 4.5-metre-wide (15 ft) Fitzroya tree.
- The "Piedra del Indio" (Indian Stone) route leads to an area with views of the mountain range and river. Here can be found examples of "Ciprés de las Guaitecas" or (Pilgerodendron).

There is a camping zone with some equipment such as tables, a wooden shelter, and information.

== Flora and fauna ==
Among the many species that can be found in the Alerce Costero National Park are:

Flora

- Alerce (Fitzroya)
- Canelo (Drimys winteri)
- Ciprés de las Guaitecas (Pilgerodendron)
- Tineo (Weinmannia trichosperma)
- Coigüe de Chiloé (Nothofagus nitida)
- Two kinds of carnivorous plants: "rocio del sol" (Drosera uniflora) and "violeta del pantano" (Pinguicula chilensis)

Fauna

- Güiña (kodkod)
- Puma (Felis concolor or cougar)
- Quique (lesser grison)
- Pudú
- Carpintero negro (Magellanic woodpecker)

== See also ==
- List of national parks of Chile
