= Abu Salim =

Abu Salim or Abou Salim may refer to:

== People ==
- Abu Salim (actor) (born 1956), Indian actor in Malayalam movies
- Abu Salim (comedian) (born 1927), Lebanese actor and comedian
- Abu Salim al-Ayyashi (1628–1679), travel writer, poet and scholar from Morocco
- Ibrahim ibn Ali of Morocco, Abu Salim, Marinid Sultan of Morocco 1359–1361
- Irfan Bakti Abu Salim (born 1951), Malaysian football (soccer) coach

== Places ==
- Abu Salim (Tripoli district), district of Tripoli, Libya
  - Abu Salim prison
    - Abu Salim Prison massacre

== Other uses ==
- Abu Salim Martyrs Brigade, an Islamist militia in Derna, Libya

== See also ==
- Salim (disambiguation)
- Abu Salem (born 1968), Indian gangster
