= Abul Khair =

Abul Khair may refer to:

- Abū l-Khayr al-Ishbīlī, 11th-century Andalusian agriculturalist
- Abu'l-Khayr Khan (1412–1468), Khan of the Uzbek Khanate
- Abul Khair Khan (1693–1748), 1st Khan of the Kazakh Junior Zhuz
- Abul Khair Najmul Karim (1922–1982), Bangladeshi sociologist and academic
- Dr. Abul Khair Mohammad Siddiq, former vice-chancellor of the University of Dhaka
- Abul Khayer Mohammad Shamsuzzoha (1924–1987), Bangladeshi politician
- Abul Khair Mohebbur Rahman (1929–2001), Bangladeshi actor
- Abul Khayer, Bangladeshi cinematographer
- Dr. Mohammad Abul Khair Firozpuri (1929–1971), Bangladeshi lecturer martyred in 1971
- Abul Khair Akyabi, police officer and politician from Myanmar
- Abul Khayer Muhammad Musa (died 2003), Bangladeshi career bureaucrat and former minister
- Abul Khair Kashfi (1932–2008), Pakistani linguist and literary critic
- Abul Khayr Alonto (1945–2019), Filipino businessman and politician
- Abul Khair Litu (born 1950), Bangladeshi businessman
- Abul Khair Bhuiyan, Bangladeshi politician
- Abul Khair Chowdhury, Bangladeshi politician
- Abul Khair Abdullah, Bangladeshi politician and Mayor of Barisal

== Companies ==
- Abul Khair Group, Bangladeshi diversified conglomerate
