= Alerce Milenario =

Very old tree in Chile

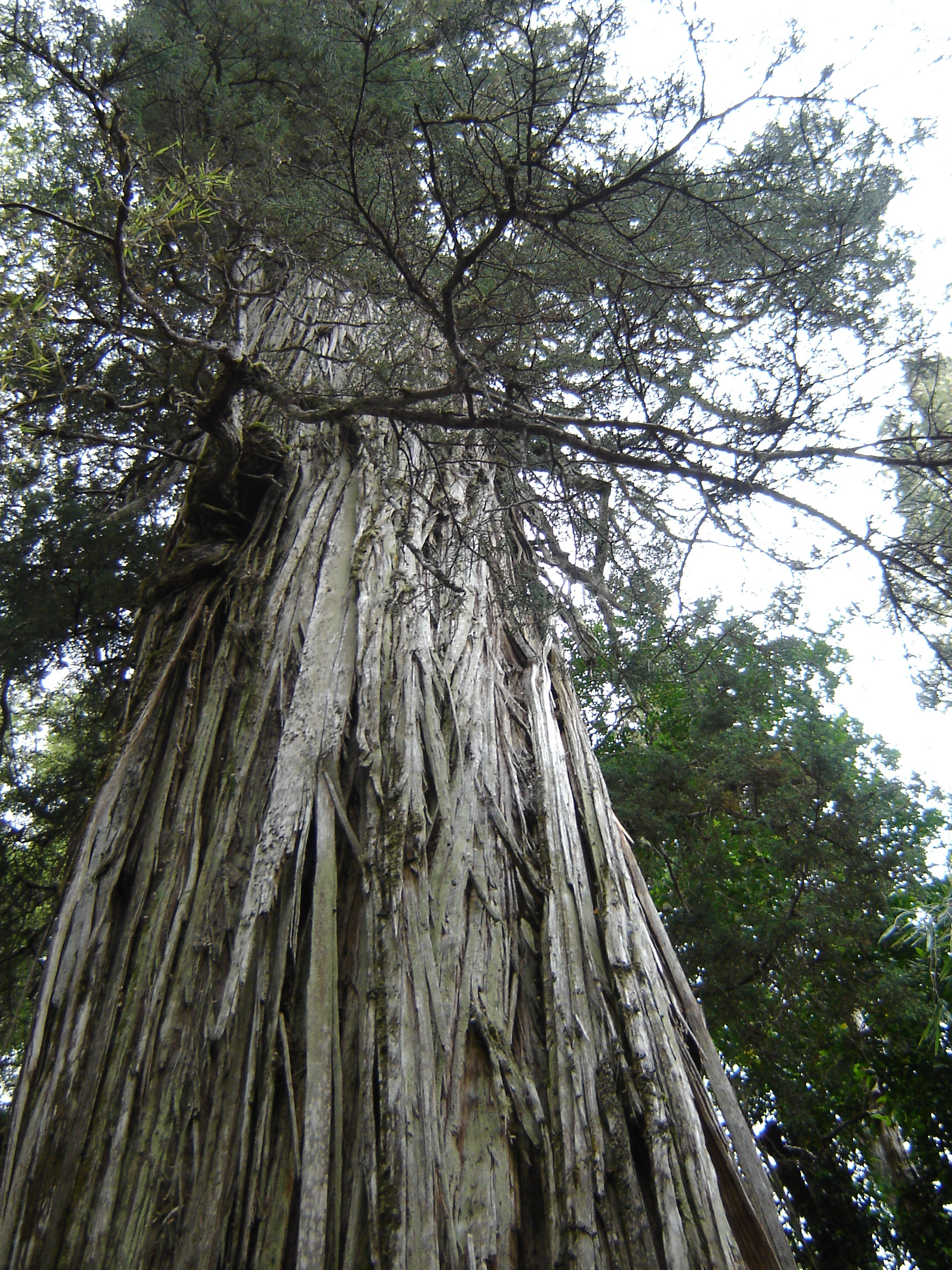
- The Alerce milenario circa 2007
- Species: Fitzroya cupressoides
- Location: Alerce Costero National Park, Chile

Alerce Milenario (Spanish: "Millennial Alerce" or "Millennial Larch") or Gran Abuelo, also known in English as Great-Grandfather, is the largest tree in Chile's Alerce Costero National Park.

While it has been on the list of oldest trees, this Alerce tree (Fitzroya cupressoides) is now rivalling others to be possibly the oldest tree in the world. In 2020, Jonathan Barichivich and Antonio Lara, of the Austral University of Chile, used an increment borer to carefully retrieve a partial sample.

== Geography ==
The Alerce Milenario Tree is located in a ravine, in the Alerce Costero National Park. The park is 137 hectares (340 acres), and up to 1,048 m (3,438 ft) above sea level. It has a rainy temperate climate with rains all year round. Its average temperature is 12°C (53°F). The park receives about 10,000 visitors a year who visit the tree.

== Description and condition of the tree ==
At more than 4 m (13 ft) across much of the crown fell away and part of the trunk died. Alerce Milenario is covered with lichens and mosses. It is estimated to have over 5000 rings. If accurate, that would be more than 100 years older than the current record holder. Barichivich said "Only 28 percent of the tree is actually alive, most of which is in the roots, so when people walk across the nearby soil, they're actively damaging the last remaining living parts of the tree."

== Dendrochronology research needed ==
Dendrochronology (or tree-ring dating) is the scientific method of dating tree rings (also called growth rings) to the exact year they were formed. As well as dating them, this can give data for dendroclimatology, the study of climate and atmospheric conditions during different periods in history from wood. Ed Cook from Columbia University has stated "The only way to truly determine the age of a tree is by dendrochronologically counting the rings and that requires all rings being present or accounted for".

However, the method dendrochronology comes with challenges, primarily due to the need to examine the internal structure of a tree. This can cause damage, and the borers used can be insufficient for the width of some trees, particularly older species where the internal core is damaged or rotten. Jonathan Barichivich and Antonio Lara, of the Austral University of Chile, bored a partial hole into the tree as far as possible without damaging it. They used an increment borer—a T-shaped drill to excise a narrow cylinder of wood without harming the tree.

The method has so far yielded evidence of approximately 2400 growth rings, but because the borer used could not reach the center of the tree, modelling was used to predict an overall age estimate of more than 5,000 years with 80% certainty.

== Protection ==
Chile's National Forest Corporation has stated it has increased protections for the tree, and added rangers to the park.

== See also ==
- List of individual trees
- List of oldest trees
