= Cheirocerus abuelo =

Conservation status
- Least Concern (IUCN 3.1)

Scientific classification
- Kingdom: Animalia
- Phylum: Chordata
- Class: Actinopterygii
- Order: Siluriformes
- Family: Pimelodidae
- Genus: Cheirocerus
- Species: C. abuelo

Binomial name
- Cheirocerus abuelo (Schultz, 1944)

Species of fish

Cheirocerus abuelo, is a species of demersal catfish of the family Pimelodidae that is native to Lago Maracaibo basin of northwestern Venezuela.

It grows to a length of 20 cm (7.9 in) It inhabits fresh water rivers in Río de los Pajaros, río Agua Caliente, río Negro, río Apón, río Socuy and Lago Maracaibo.

It is clearly distinguished from other species with 30-33 gill rakers. It feeds primarily on benthic invertebrates.
