= José Buchs =

Spanish screenwriter and film director

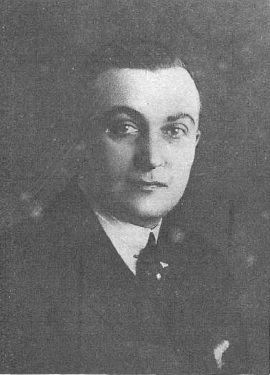
- Born: 16 January 1896; Santander, Spain
- Died: 30 January 1973 (aged 77); Madrid, Spain
- Other name: José Buchs Echeandía
- Occupations: Director, Writer
- Years active: 1911–1964 (film )

José Buchs (1896–1973) was a screenwriter and film director.

== Selected filmography ==
- The Moorish Queen (1922)
- Poor Valbuena (1923)
- Diego Corrientes (1924)
- The Grandfather (1925)
- A Famous Gentleman (1943)

== Bibliography ==
- de España, Rafael. Directory of Spanish and Portuguese film-makers and films. Greenwood Press, 1994.
