= Grandfather (boulder) =

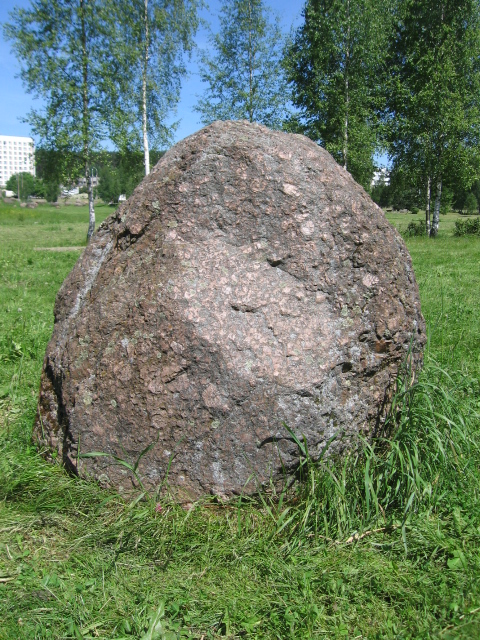
- Interactive map of Grandfather
- Location: Boulder Museum, Minsk
- Coordinates: 53°55′53.71″N 27°41′23.15″E
- Type: Boulder
- Width: 1.2 metres (3.9 ft)
- Height: 1.2 metres (3.9 ft)

The Grandfather (Belarusian: Дзед) is a granite boulder in Minsk, Belarus that was revered as a sacred stone and was part of a Slavic pagan temple until its dissolution in 1888; however worship at the boulder continued until at least 1927 when the temple's guardian was suppressed. It was moved to the Boulder Museum in Minsk during the early 1980s, where it remains to this day.

== History ==
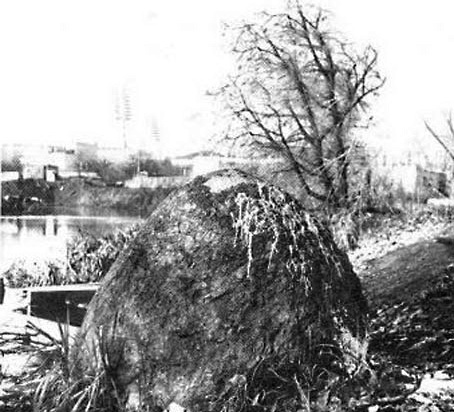
The boulder in the mid-20th century, still at is original location

The boulder was originally part of a temple on the bank of Svisloch River, it was situated on one side of the huge sacred oak known as Volat, on the other side of which was an eternal sacrificial flame known as Zhizha. Until the mid-19th century this temple was located just outside the city limits of Minsk and surrounded by a forest. Rituals were performed by a healer-guardian, a title passed down from father to son, who lived in an old wooden hut at the temple. Around the 1850s, this guardian was named Sevastey (Russian: Севастей), when he died in 1904, he was replaced by his son, Sevastey the Younger, who presided over the boulder and remained living in the house until his suppression in 1927 when the building was, according to one version, sold to a Jew who opened a retail store there. The temple was officially liquidated in 1888, once the Orthodox Church had obtained consent from the authorities to do so, as the tree was cut down and the fire extinguished; only the boulder, unmoving, remained. The boulder was consecrated as a Christian site, now accompanied with a cross and gospel, presided over by Father Yafimy; once it was discovered that he was the escaped criminal Yakhim Skardovich however, Christian service at the boulder ceased as no other priests wanted to take up the role due to describing the site as filthy and inhabited by a witch; it was subsequently fully destroyed in 1905, leaving only the boulder in its original location. Yet all this time, offerings to the boulder continued until at least the suppression of Sevastey the Younger in 1927. By the 1930s and 1940s, the boulder was flooded by the river, only becoming visible in the 1960s again. It is believed that Perun and Veles were worshiped at the temple. In the early 1980s, the boulder was moved to the Boulder Museum in Minsk where it remains to this day. Laying isolated from the other boulders at the exhibit, it still occasionally receives offerings.

Several proposals have been made to restore the temple at its original location for tourism purposes.
