= Ariel Magnus =

Argentine writer

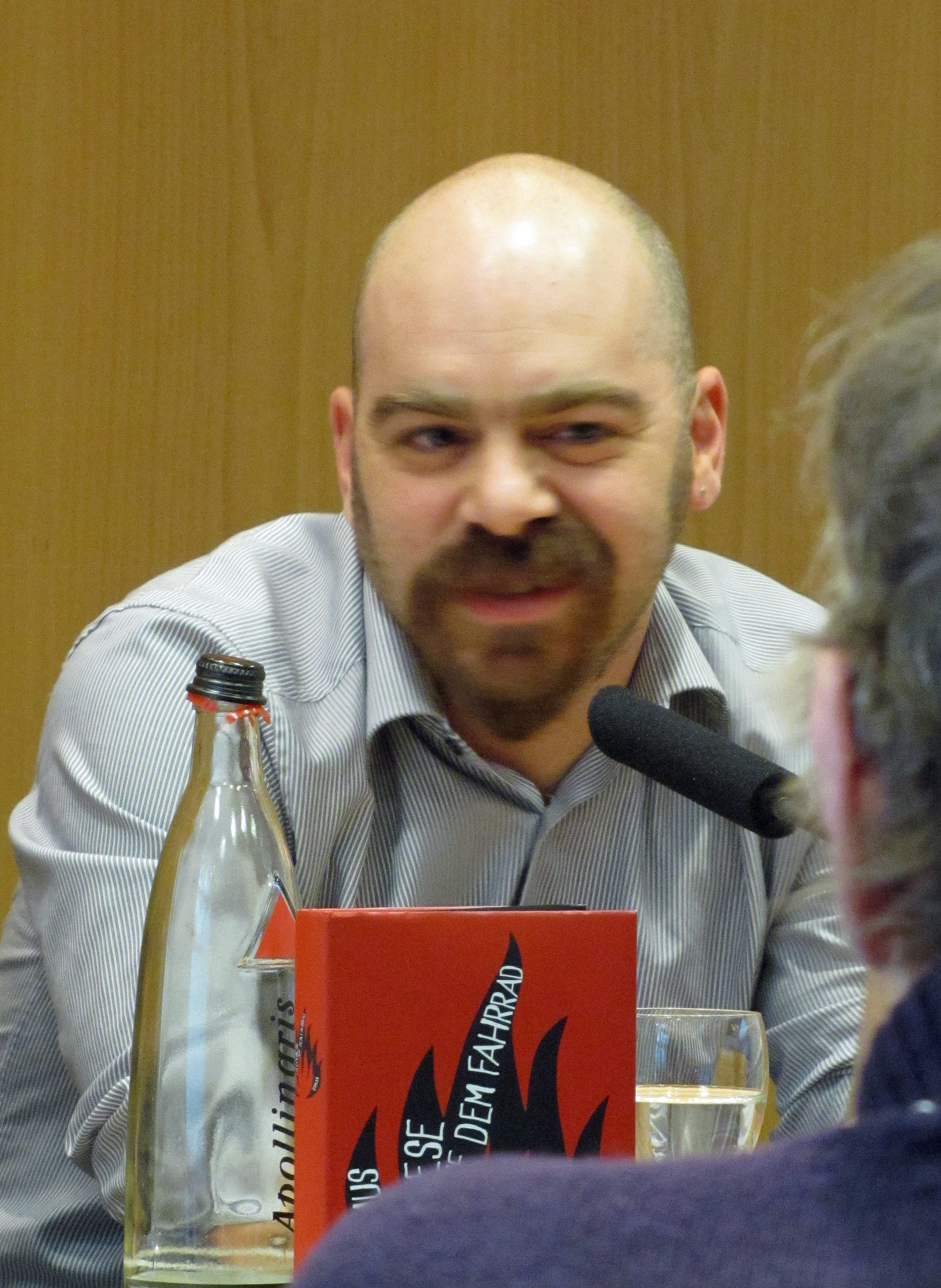
Ariel Magnus 2010 in Frankfurt am Main

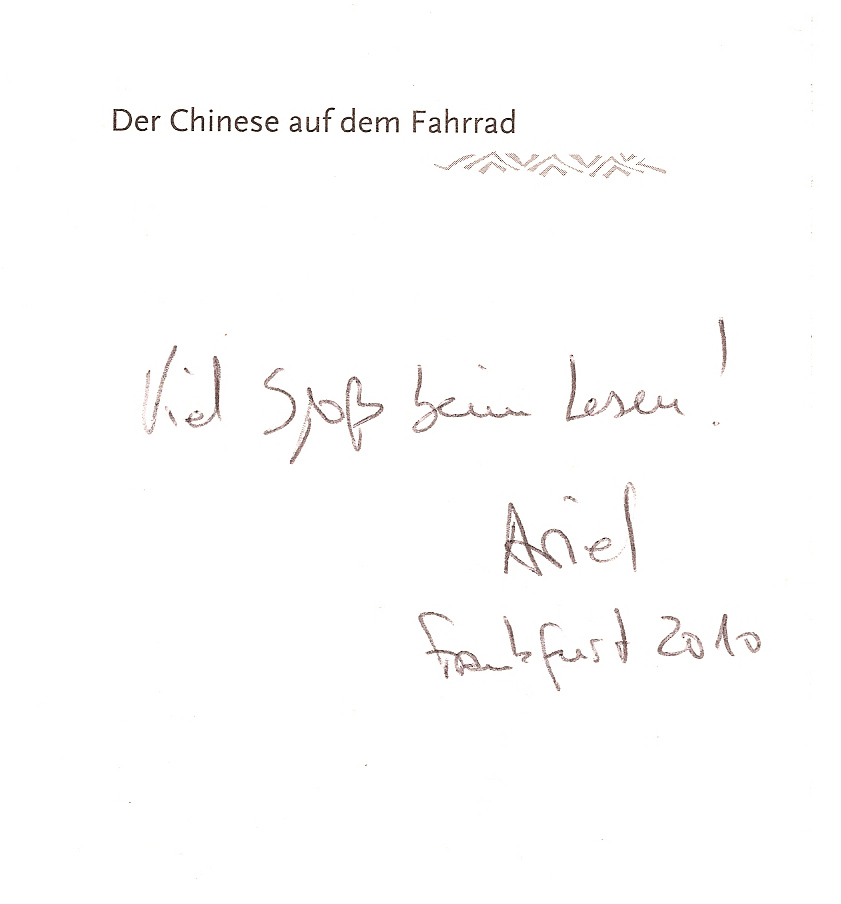
Autograph

Ariel Magnus (born October 16, 1975)) is an Argentine writer. He was born in Buenos Aires and studied Spanish literature and philosophy in Heidelberg and Berlin, Germany.

== Selected works ==
- Sandra, Emecé Editores, Buenos Aires, 2005.
- La abuela, Planeta, 2006.
- Un chino en bicicleta, Norma, 2007.
- Muñecas, Emecé Editores, 2008
- Cartas a mi vecina de arriba, Norma, 2009
