= Abu Muhammad =

Abu Muhammad may refer to:

- Abu Muhammad al-Sufyani (d. 754), Umayyad nobleman, pretender to the Caliphate
- Abu Muhammad al-Yazuri (d. 1058), Palestinian vizier to the Fatimid Caliphate
- Abu Muhammad al-Adil (d. 1227), Almohad Caliph of Morocco
- Abu Muhammad Abdul Ghafur Nassakh (1834-1889), Bengali civil servant and author
- Abu Mohammed Habibullah (1911-1983), Bangladeshi historian and writer
- Abu Mohammad Amin Uddin (born 1962), 16th Attorney General for Bangladesh
- Fethi Boucetta (born 1963), aka Abu Mohammed, a citizen of Algeria who was held in extrajudicial detention in the U.S. Guantanamo Bay detention camps

== Nom de guerre ==
- Abu Mohammad al-Julani, former nom de guerre of Syrian President Ahmed al-Sharaa
- Abu Muhammad al-Shimali, Iraqi-Saudi militant leader, $5 million bounty
- Abu Mohammad al-Adnani, Syrian ISIS leader, killed by U.S. airstrike
- Abu Muhammad Kadarsky, Russian ISIS leader, killed by FSB
- Ahmed Jabari, former second in command of Hamas, killed by Israeli drone strike

== Nom de plume ==
- Abu Muhammad al-Maqdisi, Jordanian-Palestinian Islamist writer
