= Abul Abbas =

Abul Abbas may refer to:

- Abul K. Abbas, chair of pathology at University of California San Francisco
- Abul-Abbas, Asian elephant given to Charlemagne by the Abbasid caliph Harun al-Rashid
- Muhammad I Abu 'l-Abbas, emir of Aghlabids in Ifriqiya
