= Abu Ibrahim =

Abu Ibrahim may refer to

- Abu Ibrahim (Nigerian politician), member of the Nigerian Senate
- Abdul Rahman Salama or Abu Ibrahim (born 1971), Syrian politician and former military commander
- Khalil Ibrahim Al-Zayani or Abu Ibrahim (born 1947), Saudi Arabian football coach
- Mohammad Zeki Mahjoub or Abu Ibrahim, Egyptian-Canadian who was arrested in 2000 on a security certificate for his alleged membership in the Vanguards of Conquest
- Sajeel Shahid or Abu Ibrahim, one of the leaders of Al-Muhajiroun, an Islamist group based in the United Kingdom
- Husayn Muhammad al-Umari or Abu Ibrahim, Palestinian individual on the FBI's "Most Wanted Terrorists" list for his alleged role in the bombing of Pan Am Flight 830
