= Abu language =

Abu language may refer to:

- Abu’ Arapesh language (Papua New Guinea)
- Adjora language (Papua New Guinea)
- Bu language (Nigeria)
- Abu, a Bendi language closely related to the Bokyi language in Nigeria

== See also ==
- Abure language, a Tano language of Ivory Coast (ISO code)
