= Colún Beach =

Chilean beach

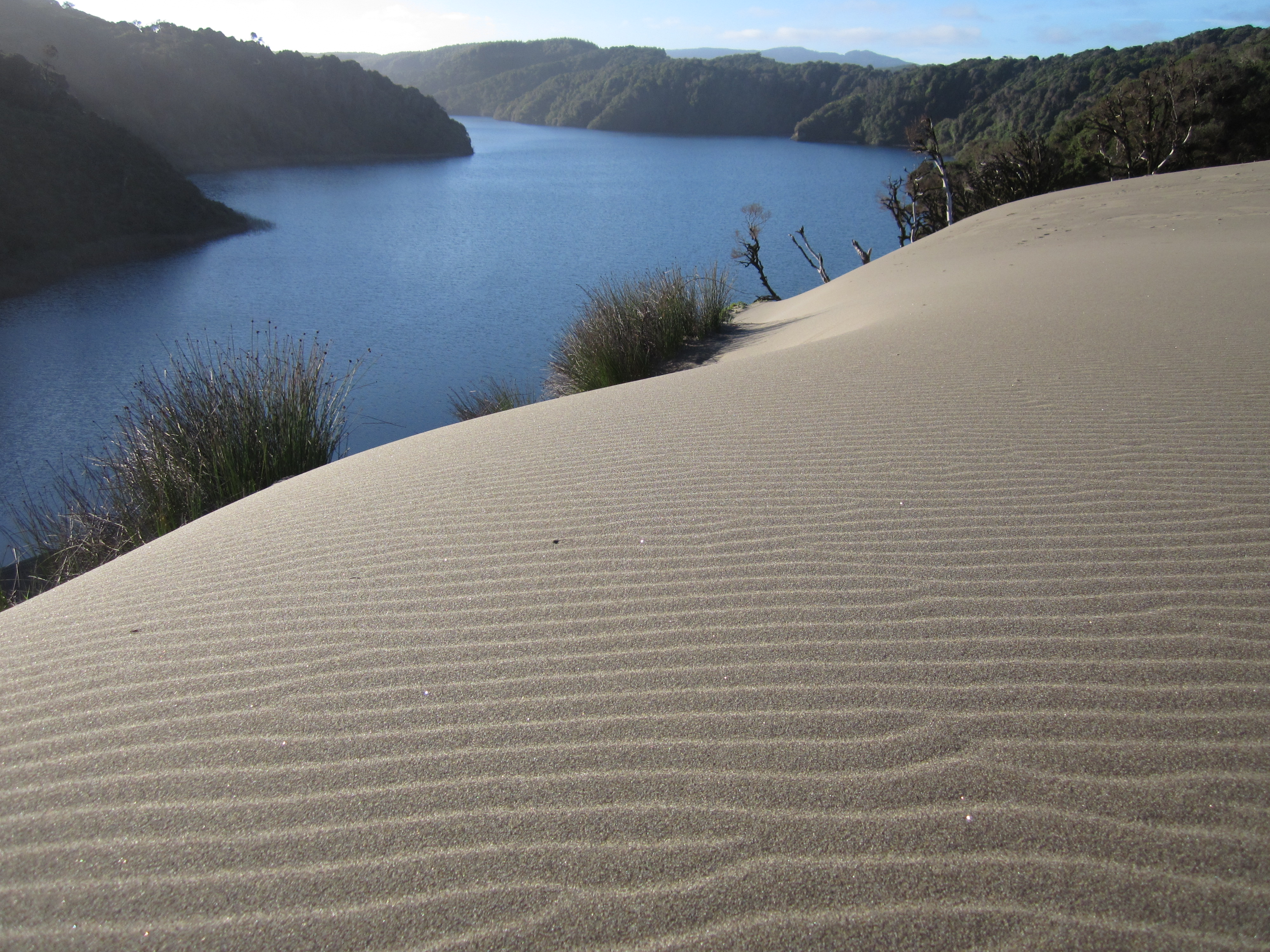
Dunes and freshwater lagoon at Colún Beach

Colún is a beach in southern Chile located south of Corral and west of La Unión. The beach is about 9 km long and runs like many other Chilean beaches from north to south along the Pacific Oceans shores. In a ranking made the newspaper El Mercurio in 2006 Colún was considered the most hidden beach in Chile. The beach has large sand dunes in its southern part and lies west of two freshwater lagoons.

Most of the beach is inside the Valdivian Coastal Reserve, created by The Nature Conservancy.

== See also ==
- Hueicolla
- Punta Galera
