= The Grandfather (1925 film) =

1925 film

- Directed by: José Buchs
- Written by: José Buchs; Benito Pérez Galdós (novel)
- Produced by: Abelardo Linares
- Starring: Modesto Rivas; Doris Wilton; Celia Escudero
- Cinematography: Armando Pou
- Production company: Film Linares
- Distributed by: Cinematográfica Verdaguer
- Release date: 7 December 1925
- Country: Spain
- Languages: Silent; Spanish intertitles

The Grandfather (Spanish:El abuelo) is a 1925 Spanish silent drama film directed by José Buchs and starring Modesto Rivas, Doris Wilton and Celia Escudero.

== Cast ==
- Modesto Rivas as Conde de Albrit
- Doris Wilton as Veraneante
- Celia Escudero as Nelly
- Arturo de la Riva as Pío Coronado
- María Comendador as Gregoria
- Ana de Leyva as Condesa Lucrecia de Ritchmon
- Alejandro Navarro as Venancio
- Juan Francés as Amigo del conde
- Francisco Martí as Prior del convento
- Cecilio Rodríguez de la Vega as Cura
- Emilio Ruiz Santiago as Senén
- Enrique Ponte as Alcalde de Jerusa
- Fernando Roldán as Carlos Erasiel y Cura

== Bibliography ==
- Eva Woods Peiró. White Gypsies: Race and Stardom in Spanish Musical Films. U of Minnesota Press, 2012.
