= Corral, Chile =

Corral
- Town and Commune
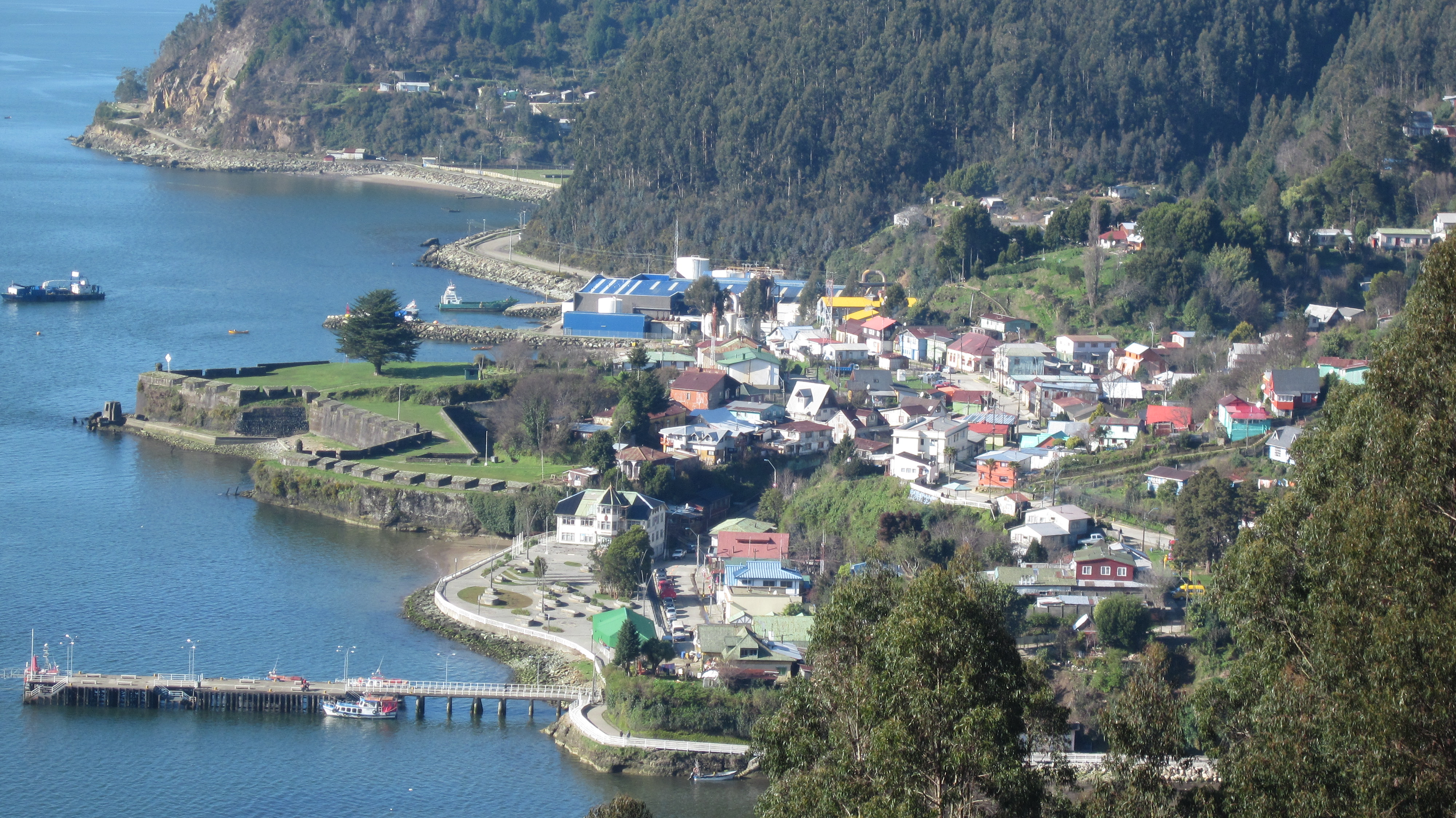
- View of Corral from the hills

- Flag Coat of arms Map of Corral in Los Ríos Region Location in Chile
- Coordinates: 39°53′18″S 73°25′57″W
- Country: Chile
- Region: Los Ríos
- Province: Valdivia
- Founded: 1894

Government
  - Type: Municipality
  - Alcalde: Miguel Hernández Mella (ILE)

Area
  - Total: 766.7 km^{2} (296.0 sq mi)
- Elevation: 61 m (200 ft)

Population (2012 census)
  - Total: 5,084
  - Density: 6.631/km^{2} (17.17/sq mi)
  - Urban: 3,670
  - Rural: 1,793
- Demonym: Corraleño

Sex
  - Men: 2,864
  - Women: 2,599
- Time zone: UTC−04:00 (CLT)
  - Summer (DST): UTC−03:00 (CLST)
- Area code: 56 + 63
- Climate: Cfb
- Website: Municipality of Corral

Corral is a town, commune, and sea port in Valdivia Province, Los Ríos Region, Chile. It is located south of Corral Bay. During the colonial period, Corral was the headquarters of the Valdivian Fort System, which protected Valdivia. Economic activities in Corral revolve around forestry, aquaculture, fishing, port services and both heritage, and eco tourism.

The town is connected by road to Valdivia and Caleta Chaihuín, as well as via ferry to Niebla.

== History ==
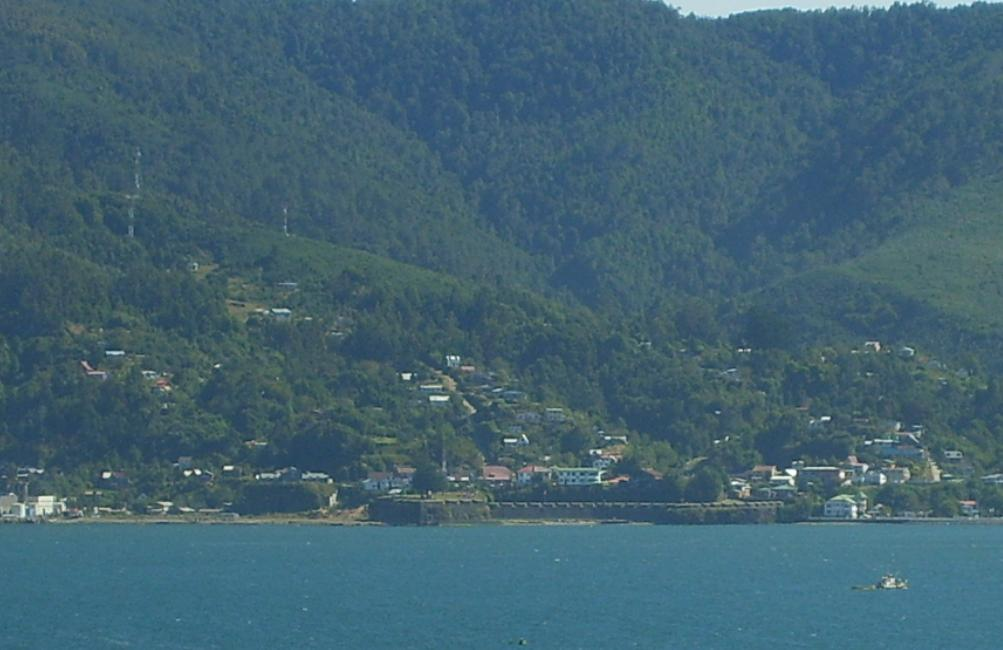
Corral and its fort as seen from Niebla

The settlement of Corral originated as the headquarters of the Valdivian Fort System, which was built in 1645 to protect the city of Valdivia. At the time, Spanish ships sailed along the Valdivia River to Valdivia, but Corral soon took over the role of receiving major ships. The fort of Corral had no more than four cannons until 1749. Renewed interest in the defense of Valdivia led Juan Zermeño to expand and improve the fort between 1767 and 1773, when work was halted to focus on the battery of Chorocamayo. The renovation was executed by Juan Garland, who extensively modified Zermeño's plans. Indigenous Cuncos, who were at war with the Spanish, had planned to attack Corral in 1770 and had built for that reason a road from Punta Galera to the port, which the Spanish garrison dismantled.

The modern core of Corral grew around the fort Castillo de Corral in the 1770s. By 1798 this settlement outside the fort had a population of 49. During the Chilean Independence War, Corral and Valdivia were united with Chiloé as royalist strongholds. In 1820, Thomas Cochrane, commander of the newly created Chilean Navy, captured Corral and Valdivia in an amphibious attack.

Through the early 20th century, Corral was an important port for traffic between the Pacific and the Atlantic Oceans, as Chilean port were declared open to ships sailing under any state flag.

Hydraulic sawmills were built in Corral in 1847–1848.

=== Decline ===
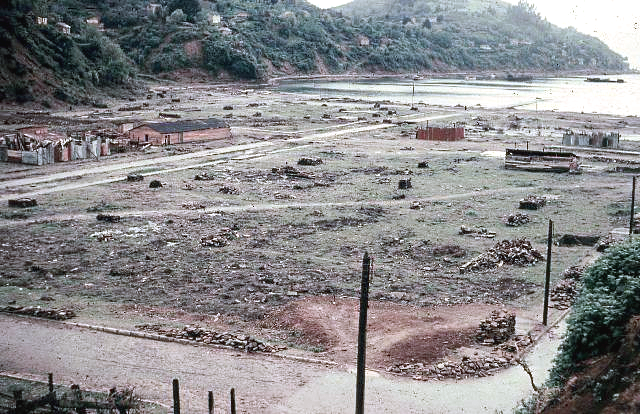
The destroyed center of Corral in Autumn 1960

Corral's economy experienced a series of events in the 20th century that led its decline. Train routes that connected Valdivia and Osorno to central Chile, as well as the opening of the Panama Canal resulted in the loss of most domestic and international traffic to in Corral.

In 1910, Altos Hornos y Acerías de Corral opened in Corral what was then the largest steel mill in South America. It produced high-cost pig iron using charcoal, and was labour-intensive. The steel mill proved to be an economical failure and was finally closed in 1958.

Corral was for a time an important whaling port. The local whaling industry was disrupted for the duration of the First World War, when it was impossible to import needed supplies, but resumed afterwards. Whaling in Chile declined dramatically in the 1960s and ended altogether in 1983. Remnants of whaling infrastructure are still visible on land.

The decline of Corral culminated in 1960 with the Great Chilean Earthquake. With a magnitude of 9.4–9.6, it remains the largest ever recorded. Houses, roads, and port facilities were destroyed. The resulting tsunami obliterated the neighborhood of Corral Bajo and approximately 30% of nearby Corral Alto. Among the losses were a series stilt houses between Corral Bajos and Amargos. After the earthquake many families in corral relocated to the neighborhood of La Aguada. As of 2015, only one pier, privately owned by a local company for the shipping of wood chips, remained. The maximum permissible draught is 12.20 metres.

== Demographics ==
Historical population
| Year | Pop. | ±% p.a. |
|---|---|---|
| 1875 | 1,189 | — |
| 1885 | 1,243 | +0.45% |
| 1895 | 1,573 | +2.38% |
| 1907 | 2,863 | +5.12% |
| 1920 | 3,032 | +0.44% |
| 1930 | 5,319 | +5.78% |
| 1940 | 8,619 | +4.95% |
| 1952 | 9,853 | +1.12% |
| 1970 | 5,553 | −3.14% |
| 1982 | 5,298 | −0.39% |
| 1992 | 5,765 | +0.85% |
| 2002 | 5,463 | −0.54% |
| 2017 | 5,302 | −0.20% |
| 2024 | 5,424 | +0.33% |
Source: "Censo de Población y Vivienda". National Statistics Institute.

According to the 2002 census of the National Statistics Institute, Corral spans an area of 766.7 km^{2} (296 sq mi) and has 5,463 inhabitants (2,864 men and 2,599 women). Of these, 3,670 (67.2%) lived in urban areas and 1,793 (32.8%) in rural areas. The population fell by 5.2% (302 persons) between the 1992 and 2002 censuses.

== Administration ==
As a commune, Corral is a third-level administrative division of Chile administered by a municipal council, headed by an alcalde who is directly elected every four years. The 2008–2012 alcalde was Gaston Peréz González (ILE).

Within the electoral divisions of Chile, Corral is represented in the Chamber of Deputies by Alfonso De Urresti (PS) and Roberto Delmastro (RN) as part of the 53rd electoral district, together with Valdivia, Lanco, Mariquina and Máfil. The commune is represented in the Senate during the 2014–2022 period by Alfonso de Urresti (PS) and Ena von Baer (UDI) as part of the 16th senatorial constituency (Los Ríos Region).

== See also ==
- Altos Hornos y Acerías de Corral
- Guape
- Morro Gonzalo

== Notes and references ==
Bibliography

- Guarda Geywitz, Fernando (1953). Historia de Valdivia (in Spanish). Santiago de Chile: Imprenta Cultura.
