= The Moorish Queen (1922 film) =

1922 film

- Directed by: José Buchs
- Written by: José Buchs; José Serrano; Joaquín Álvarez Quintero
- Cinematography: José María Maristany
- Production company: Atlántida Films
- Release date: 1922
- Country: Spain
- Languages: Silent; Spanish intertitles

The Moorish Queen (Spanish:La reina mora) is a 1922 Spanish silent film directed by José Buchs. It was based on a zarzuela, which was made into further films in 1937 and 1954.

== Cast ==
- José Aguilera
- Gloria Aymerich
- Francisco Cejuela
- María Comendador
- Carmen de Córdoba
- Antonio Gil Varela 'Varillas' as Don Nué
- José Montenegro
- Consuelo Reyes

== Bibliography ==
- Eva Woods Peiró. White Gypsies: Race and Stardom in Spanish Musical Films. U of Minnesota Press, 2012.
