= The Grandmother (1981 film) =

1981 film

- Theatrical release poster
- Written by: Julio Jiménez
- Screenplay by: Julio Jiménez; Leopoldo Pinzón
- Produced by: María Emma Mejía
- Starring: Teresa Gutierrez; Gloria Gómez; José Saldarriaga
- Cinematography: Víctor Jorge Ruiz
- Edited by: Leopoldo Pinzón; Jorge Rintá
- Music by: Raúl Domínguez
- Production companies: Dinavisión; Cine Colombia.
- Release date: 9 April 1981
- Running time: 112 minutes
- Country: Colombia

La abuela (English: The grandmother) is a 1981 Colombian drama film directed by Leopoldo Pinzón. The plot follows a traditional well to do decadent family in Bogotá ruled by a domineering grandmother who only loves her favorite grandson. The film was based on a popular Colombian soap opera of the same name.

== Cast ==
- Teresa Gutierrez as Brigida Paredes "La abuela"
- Lucero Galindo as Victoria
- José Saldarriaga as Hernancito
- Gloria Gómez as Libertad
- Ana Mojica as Zenobia
