= Caleta Chaihuín =

Hamlet in Valdivia, Los Ríos, Chile

- hamlet
- Location within Chile
- Coordinates: 39°57′08″S 73°34′32″W
- Region: Los Ríos
- Province: Valdivia
- Municipalidad: Corral
- Comuna: Corral

Government
  - Type: Municipalidad
  - Alcade: Miguel Herández Mella

Population (2017)
  - Total: 156
- hamlet

Sex
  - Men: 76
  - Women: 80
- Time zone: UTC−04:00 (Chilean Standard)
  - Summer (DST): UTC−03:00 (Chilean Daylight)
- Area code: Country + town = 56 + 63

Caleta Chaihuín (Chaihuín) is a coastal hamlet (Spanish: caserío) and rural district in the commune of Corral, Los Ríos Region, Chile. It lies at the mouth of Chaihuín River that flows from the Valdivian Coast Range to the Pacific Ocean. Silt from the river combined with the prevailing coastal current have formed a barrier-bar across the cove creating an estuary. The administration and main entrance to the Valdivian Coastal Reserve lies in Chaihuín.

== History ==
The indigenous inhabitants of the area are Huilliche people.

During the early 1970s Chaihuín was considered a hot-bed of the Revolutionary Left Movement (MIR), but with limited actual anti-government activity.

In 2010 a new ferry service from the town of Corral was inaugurated.

== Demographics ==
In 2017 Caleta Chaihuín had a population of 156 inhabitants up from 36 in 2002.

The rural district of Chaihuín encompasses a larger area than the hamlet itself. Its population has grown from 206 in 1920 to over 800.

Census year	Total population
1920	206
1930	242
1952	not reported
1960	501
1970	473
1982	504
1992	677
2002	788
