= Cordillera Pelada =

Mountain range in Chile

Pelada Range
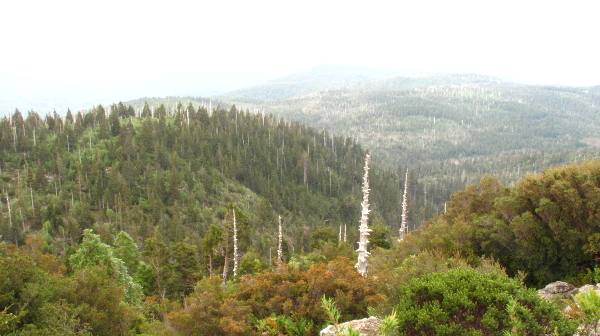
- View of Fitzroya forests of Cordillera Pelada in La Unión commune

Geography
- Country: Chile
- Region(s): Los Ríos, Los Lagos
- Range coordinates: 40°22.2′S 73°37.8′W
- Parent range: Cordillera de la costa

Geology
- Orogeny: Toco
- Rock age: Carboniferous
- Rock type(s): Schists and gneiss of the Bahía Mansa Metamorphic Complex

Cordillera Pelada (Spanish for Bald Range or Barren Range) is a mountain range in southern Los Ríos Region, southern Chile. It is located along the Pacific coast and forms part of the larger Chilean Coast Range. It got its name pelada from the Spanish word for bare or bald in reference to large fires that once burned the forests on the cordillera.

From about 1750 to 1943, when the land between Maullín River and Valdivia was colonized by Spain and Chile, numerous fires of Fitzroya woods occurred in Cordillera Pelada. These fires were initiated by Spaniards, Chileans, and Europeans. Earlier, from 1397 to 1750 the Fitzroya woods of Cordillera Pelada also suffered from fires that originated from lightning strikes and indigenous inhabitants.

== See also ==
- Chilean Coast Range
- Cordillera de Nahuelbuta
- Cordillera de Mahuidanchi
