= Tectonic evolution of Patagonia =

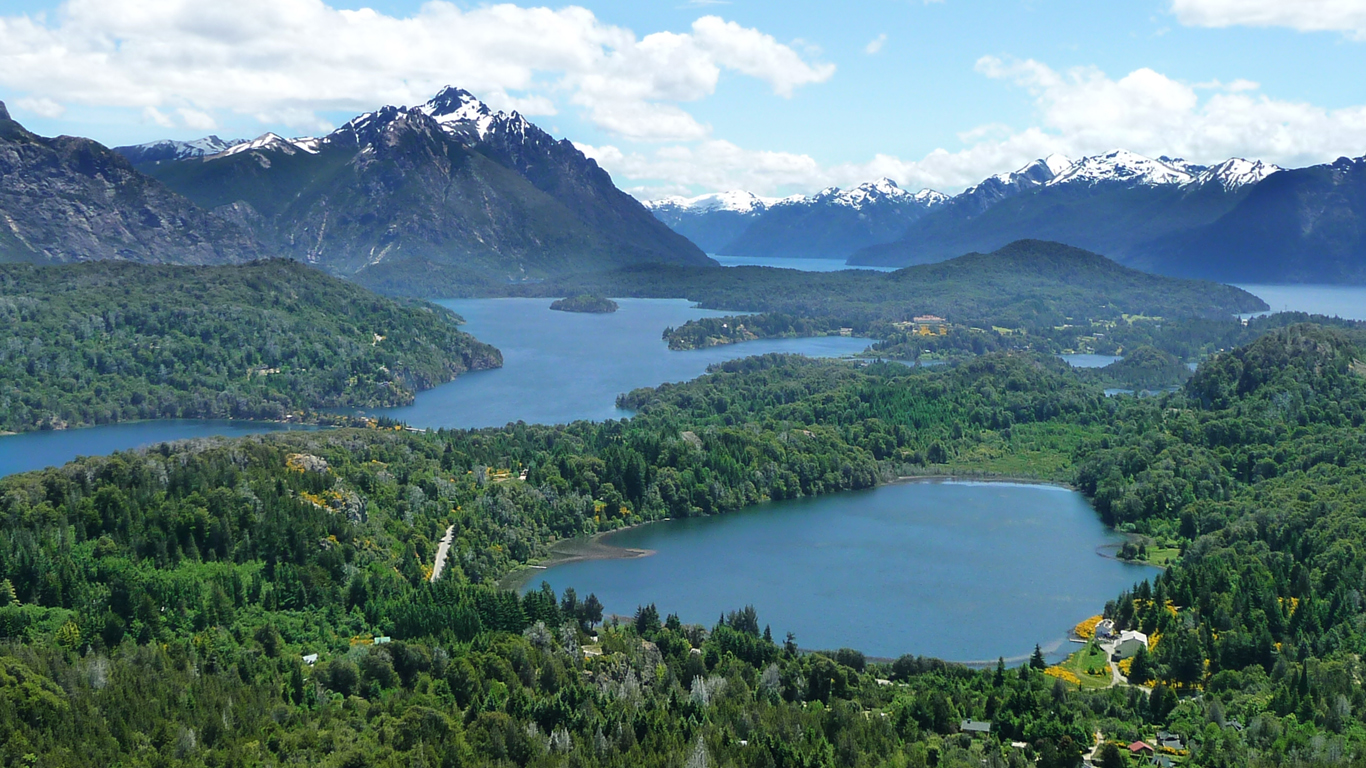
The town of Bariloche and its surroundings, in northwestern Patagonia.

Patagonia comprises the southernmost region of South America, portions of which lie on either side of the Argentina-Chile border. It has traditionally been described as the region south of the Rio Colorado, although the physiographic border has more recently been moved southward to the Huincul fault. The region's geologic border to the north is composed of the Rio de la Plata craton and several accreted terranes comprising the La Pampa province. The underlying basement rocks of the Patagonian region can be subdivided into two large massifs: the North Patagonian Massif and the Deseado Massif. These massifs are surrounded by sedimentary basins formed in the Mesozoic that underwent subsequent deformation during the Andean orogeny. Patagonia is known for its vast earthquakes and the damage they cause.

The rocks comprising Patagonia occurred along the southwestern margin of the ancient supercontinent of Gondwana. During a period of continental rifting in the Cambrian period, a portion of Patagonia was separated from Gondwana, and the resulting passive margin that formed was a site of extensive sedimentation throughout the early-middle Paleozoic era. During the Devonian period, a transition to convergence resulted in the eventual collision of the Patagonian landmass in the late Paleozoic, with contact first occurring in the mid-Carboniferous. Several theories exist for the origin of the Patagonian landmass, though there are two that have greater consensus. The first of these theories cites an allochthonous origin of the Patagonian landmass from Gondwana during the Paleozoic, while the other argues that Northern Patagonia is an autochthonous component and that only the southern portion is allochthonous. The collision of Patagonia was succeeded by the rifting and eventual breakup of Gondwana during the early Mesozoic, a process which invoked large-scale rotation of the Patagonian landmass. Further extension through the Jurassic and Cretaceous periods formed the Rocas Verdes back-arc basin, while a transition to a compressional tectonic regime in the Cenozoic concurrent with the Andean orogeny resulted in formation of the foreland Magallanes basin.

== Precambrian-Early Paleozoic setting ==
Patagonia contain two ancient regions: the North Patagonian Massif and Deseado Massif. The lithospheric mantle beneath Deseado Massif formed 1000–2100 million years ago in the Paleo and Mesoproterozoic, evidencing that its lithosphere has a much older history than the ages of crustal rocks exposed at present would suggest (~600 million years). Deseado Massif has formed a single crustal block with the Falklands Islands since these times. Like today the Deseado Massif and the Falklands Islands lied next to each other in the Neoproterozoic supercontinent of Rodinia. The lithosphere of the North Patagonian Massif formed about the same.

Prior to the collision of Patagonia, the nucleus of modern-day South America was contained within a portion of the southwest margin of Gondwana. This margin consisted of the ancient Rio de la Plata craton and a number of accreted terranes, whose boundaries have been discovered using paleomagnetic studies. The Rio de la Plata Craton is believed to have been a component of southwest Gondwana since the end of the Proterozoic, likely forming a single body with other Gondwanan crustal blocks. In the late Neoproterozoic-early Cambrian, the Pampia terrane collided with the western margin of the Rio de la Plata craton, resulting in the Pampean orogeny. Evidence indicates that this Pampia terrane is of parautochthonous Gondwanan origin, separated from Gondwana in an earlier event to later be re-accreted to its margin.

== Early Paleozoic ==
The Early Paleozoic tectonic regime in southwestern Gondwana involved a period of rifting during the Cambrian which affected the southern margin of the supercontinent, while at the same time the western margin experienced a compressional setting that saw the accretion of several exotic terranes. It has been hypothesized that following the Cambrian rifting event the Patagonian landmass collided with Antarctica, though evidence for this event is not conclusive.

=== Cambrian rifting ===
Early Cambrian rifting of the southwestern Gondwana margin is evidenced by the presence of granites bearing an extensional geochemical signature in the Sierra de la Ventana fold belt north of the Patagonian limits. The occurrence of this rifting event is also documented in the Ellsworth Mountains of Antarctica, the Cape Fold Belt of South Africa, and the Falkland/Malvinas microplate (present day Falkland Islands), and resulted in the formation of a proto-Pacific passive margin. This rifting stage formed the final outline of southern Gondwana and is thought to have been the beginning of the supercontinent stage in Gondwana. Evidence found in rocks in the Tierra del Fuego region indicates that this Cambrian rifting event might have resulted in the separation of the southern tip of South America from Gondwana.

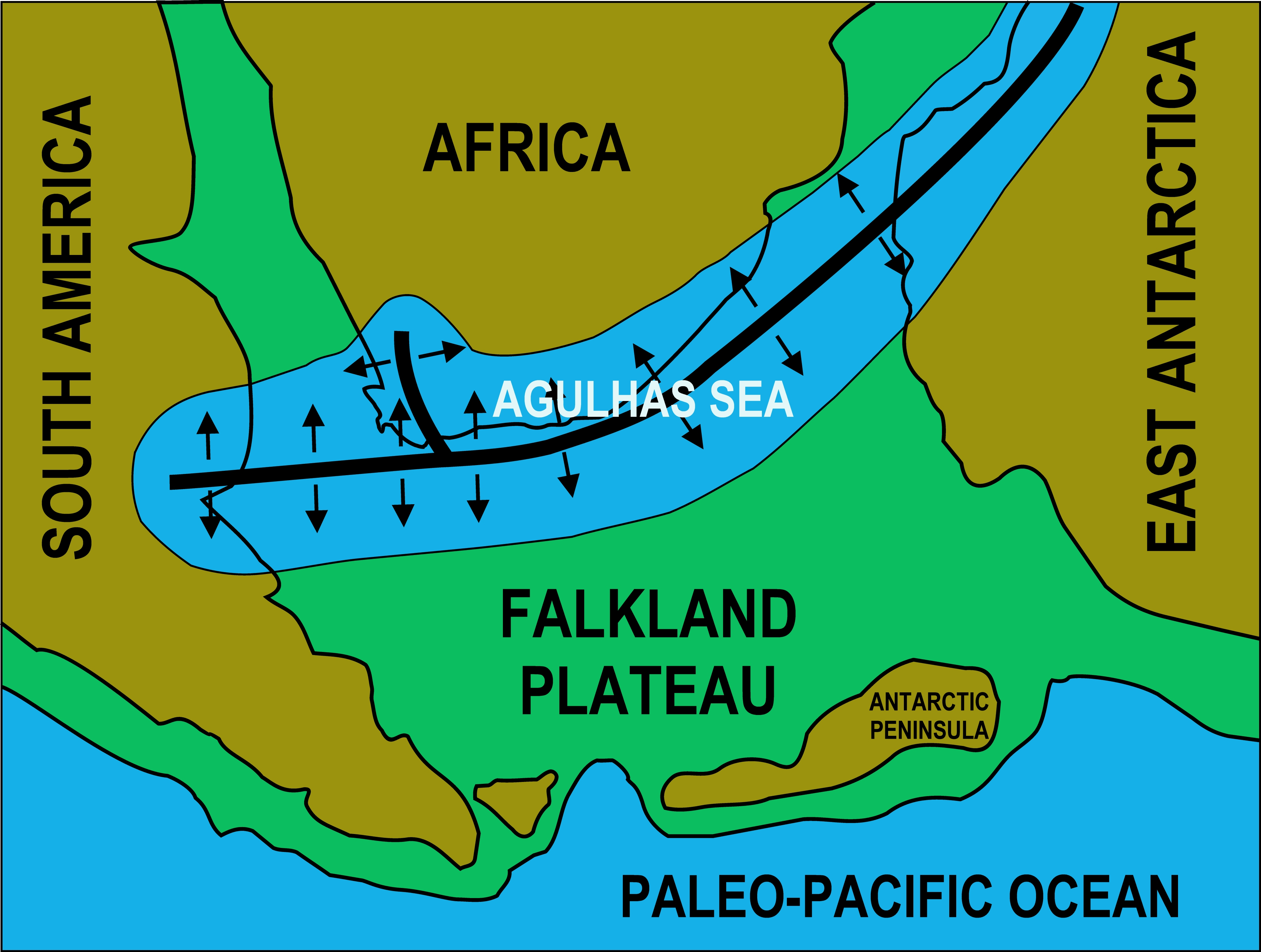
The Cambrian rifting event in southwestern Gondwana, which included at least a portion of Patagonia.

This rifting event and the detachment of a portion of Patagonia are agreed upon by the two prominent theories regarding Patagonia's origin; however, they disagree on the extent of the displaced terrane. The theory supporting an allochthonous Patagonia cites the entirety of the region, including the North Patagonian Massif, as being separated from southwestern Gondwana. Comparison of the paleomagnetic poles of Patagonia and Gondwana from the Devonian to Permian periods allows for the separation of the two landmasses by up to 1000 kilometres; however, though such a separation is permitted by the evidence, it is not required in order to explain differences in the pole positions. The autochthonous theory meanwhile states that the North Patagonian Massif was not separated during this event, and suggests that rifting resulted only in the separation of a terrane represented by the Deseado Massif.

The large, continuous passive margin produced during this rifting event led to the formation of several associated basins. Sediments derived from Gondwana infilled these basins throughout the early Paleozoic until the Devonian period, resulting in the accumulation of thick sedimentary units which later underwent extensive deformation due to the transition to a compressional tectonic regime.

=== Collision of Exotic Terranes ===
While rifting was occurring in the southern portion of Gondwana, the margin further west (along the proto-Andean belt) was experiencing a compressional regime that introduced several allochthonous terranes to the western margin of South America. The first of these, the Pampean orogeny (mentioned above), resulted in the accretion of the Pampia terrane. This was followed by the formation of the Famatina-Eastern Puna magmatic arc during the Famatinian orogeny in the Ordovician period, which culminated in the accretion of the Cuyania (Precordillera) terrane. Paleomagnetic evidence suggests that this Cuyania terrane is of Laurentian origin, and it has been hypothesized that the terrane may have been a plateau attached to Laurentia which was involved in the Cambrian rifting event and later accreted during collision between Laurentia and Gondwana. Geochronological evidence shows that the Famatinian magmatic belt extends south from the Andean margin into the North Patagonian massif, and paleomagnetic studies of these rocks indicate that separation between these bodies has not occurred at least since the Devonian, both lending support to the theory of an autochthonous component of Patagonia. Subduction continued along this margin, and in the late Devonian resulted in the collision and accretion of the Chilenia terrane to the western border of the Precordillera.

While collision of Chilenia occurred north of the Huincul lineament south of it the Chaitenia terrane accreted to Patagonia in the Devonian. The metamorphosed rocks of Chaitenia crop out mainly in southern Chile and represent remnants of an ancient island arc that existed next to Patagonia. After accretion, accretionary complexes developed west of Chaitenia, meaning Chaitenia constituted a backstop.

=== Patagonia-Antarctica collision ===
Following the early Cambrian rifting event, Antarctica underwent a deformational event resulting in uplift of the Transantarctic Mountains in the mid-Cambrian, an event that has been ascribed to the Ross orogeny. It has recently been proposed that during middle to late Cambrian times Patagonia was accreted to East Antarctica, an event that led to the initiation of the Ross orogeny. Following this collision, a transition to extension in the late Ordovician-Silurian resulted in the separation of Patagonia from Antarctica and the formation of a passive margin. Deposition along this passive margin is represented by the Devonian-age lower section of the Beacon Supergroup. Proposed evidence for this connection exists in both the North Patagonian and Deseado Massifs, where remnants of the fossil species of archeocyathids have been discovered, a species preserved in the Shackleton Limestone of the Transantarctic Mountains. Additionally, segments of the Sierra Grande Formation in both massifs show possible correlation with the Beacon Supergroup bearing a common Devonian age. Correlation between granites found in northeastern Patagonia and others involved in the Ross orogeny has also been suggested, but such a connection is lacking geochronological evidence.

== Late Paleozoic ==
=== Carboniferous-Permian collision ===
Lasting throughout the early to middle Paleozoic, rifting in the region was interrupted in the mid-Devonian when the tectonic scheme switched from an extensional to compressional one, a process that resulted in the collision of the Patagonian terrane with the southwestern Gondwanan margin. Subduction-related igneous rocks from beneath the North Patagonian Massif have been dated at 320–330 million years old, indicating that the subduction process initiated in the early Carboniferous. This was relatively short lived (lasting about 20 million years), and initial contact of the two landmasses occurred in the mid-Carboniferous, with broader collision during the early Permian. This collision resulted in the formation of two distinct magmatic and metamorphic belts in the North Patagonian Massif, one in the north and one in the west. Isotopic dating of zircon from the magmatic belts provides evidence that the activity forming the western magmatic arc ceased during the late Carboniferous and may have involved collision of the Antarctic Peninsula with the southwest margin. Deformation and metamorphism resulting from this terrane collision may have begun in the late Carboniferous period and continued into the Permian period. Such deformation is postulated to have had a role in the initiation of the Gondwanide Orogeny and formation of the Gondwanide Fold Belt, which includes the Sierra de la Ventana mountains north of Patagonia and the Cape Fold Belt of South Africa. The collisions in this portion of the southwest margin of Gondwana during this time were likely the precursor to the Terra Australis orogen that later affected this region. Also in the Late Paleozoic the two main landmasses of Patagonia; the North Patagonian Massif and Deseado Massif inferred to have collided following a period of subduction of the plate of Deseado Massif beneath the plate containing the North Patagonian Massif. This subduction is postulated to have eroded the lithospheric mantle beneath the North Patagonian Massif. (Note: The removal of the Precambrian lithospheric mantle of the North Patagonian Massif might explain why this region is poorer in gold compared to the Deseado Massif. This could be so since gold at Earth's surface comes ultimately from the mantle, but not all parcels of the mantle are equally rich in gold.)

As the prominent tectonic models for Patagonian accretion to Gondwana differ in their interpretation of the extent of the terrane that was detached during the Cambrian rifting, by definition they disagree on the extent of the terrane that was accreted in the Permian.

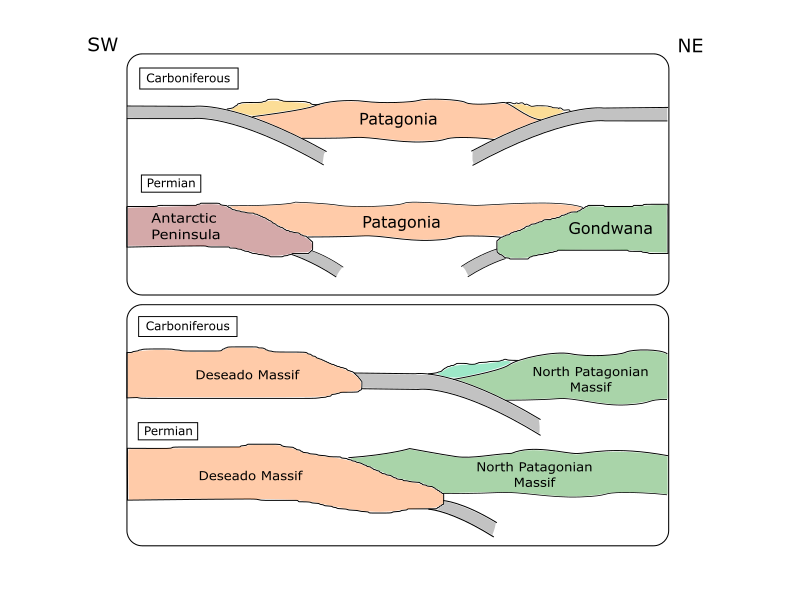
The two primary models for the collision of the Patagonian terrane against Gondwana in the late Paleozoic period: the allochthonous theory (above) and the autochthonous theory (below).

==== Allochthonous theory ====
The allochthonous theory hypothesizes that the entirety of Patagonia, including both basement massifs were separated from Gondwana during rifting in the Cambrian. One version of this model includes a hypothetical independent collision of the two massifs following rifting in the Cambrian to form the Patagonia terrane prior to its eventual collision with Gondwana. The two magmatic belts found in the North Patagonian Massif are inferred to represent collision of this portion of Patagonia against the margin of Gondwana following the closure of an ocean basin during convergence and subduction. By this model, the western belt in the North Patagonian Massif would have been formed due to subduction of oceanic crust under its southern margin, with termination of subduction resulting from collision of the Antarctic Peninsula during the mid-late Carboniferous. Meanwhile, the northern belt would have been created during subduction of oceanic crust underneath its northern margin. Geophysical studies in the region discovered a large subsurface structure along the northern Patagonian border, which cuts off the suture boundaries between the Rio de la Plata craton and its westward accreted terranes. This feature has been hypothesized as representing the suture zone of Patagonia with Gondwana.

==== Autochthonous theory ====
According to the autochthonous theory, the North Patagonian Massif is an autochthonous portion of former Gondwana that has been in its current position since at least the Ordovician. The Deseado Massif, however, is believed to be an allochthonous (or parautochthonous) component, detached from Gondwana during the Cambrian rifting episode and accreted again in the Permian. There is evidence that crustal magnetic signatures on either side of the Huincul fault zone are the same, indicating the North Patagonian Massif and southwestern Gondwana may have been one continuous landmass through the Paleozoic. The late Paleozoic collision then is believed to have occurred between the Deseado Massif and the southwestern edge of the North Patagonian Massif, with oceanic crust being subducted below the southern margin of the North Patagonian Massif to form the observed magmatic belts in that region.

Late Permian break off of the subducting slab resulted in upwelling of the mantle and extensive melting of the crust followed by a transition to post-orogenic collapse, an episode which is preserved in the Choiyoi Group volcanic province. There is a possibility that the collision of the Deseado Massif terrane with the Gondwana margin may have produced a tear in the subducting slab, leading to its eventual break-off.

== Mesozoic extension ==
=== Rifting of Gondwana ===
Following the period of late Paleozoic convergence that led to the collision of Patagonia with Gondwana, a transition to extensional tectonics in the Triassic period induced rifting within Patagonia. This extension began northwest of Patagonia along the pre-existing suture zone between the Chilenia and Cuyania terranes and led to the formation of the Cuyo basin, among others. More widespread rifting began in the Jurassic, by which time the breakup of Gondwana was underway. This was accompanied by the initiation and evolution of the Southern Atlantic rift system which led to the opening of the South Atlantic Ocean. The extension led to formation of fault-bounded basins, including the Cañadon Asfalto Basin and Rocas Verdes Basin. Though initially a continental rift basin, the Rocas Verdes Basin transitioned to a back-arc basin with the introduction of proto-oceanic crust, for which evidence is preserved in the Sarmiento and Tortuga ophiolite sequences.

=== Rotations within Patagonia ===
During the early breakup of Gondwana and associated continental rifting, the Patagonian landmass underwent large-scale rotations. Paleomagnetic data from late Jurassic-early Cretaceous rocks in the southern portion of the North Patagonian Massif indicate that clockwise rotation of up to 30 degrees occurred in that area during the Early Cretaceous, affecting a crustal block at least tens of kilometers in size. Additional findings from within the Deseado Massif revealed that similar rotations occurred in that area as well, either during the same Early Cretaceous episode or in an earlier deformational event during the Late Jurassic. Similar processes are reported to have affected the Falkland Islands, and may have been operating at the same time as those in Patagonia. The mechanism behind these rotations is unclear, and evidence of associated deformational structures is scarce. It has been proposed that the Gastre Fault System is one such structure that accommodated much of the deformation involved with crustal rotations; however, this hypothesis lacks supporting evidence.

== Cretaceous-Cenozoic ==
=== Compression and foreland basin formation ===
During the Cretaceous, accelerating spreading rates of mid-ocean ridges in the Pacific and Atlantic Oceans as well as increased subduction below the western margin caused a shift from extensional tectonics towards compression, concurrent with the initiation of the Andean orogeny. This transition resulted in inversion of the Rocas Verdes Basin and ultimately led to its closure in the Late Cretaceous. Associated with closure of the basin was the development of the Andean fold and thrust belt. Deep-water sediment deposition during the Late Cretaceous contractional phase formed the thick Cerro Toro Formation, and subsequent formations record the progressive movement of deposition from deep-water to shallow-water and ultimately deltaic environments.

=== Basin uplift and deformation ===
Continued compression through the Tertiary period and the associated horizontal shortening resulted in uplift and associated deformation of the Andean fold and thrust belt and provided exposure of formations within the Magallanes Basin. Though the sequence of deformational events leading to the present day formation is unclear, observational evidence from the region indicates that there were three notable periods of deformation, occurring in the Late Cretaceous period, the Oligocene epoch, and some time following the Miocene epoch. Reconstructions of the events that resulted in deformation of the basin are complicated by variability in the style and extent of deformation along the Patagonian Andes, ranging from intense folding and steep thrust faulting with accompanying metamorphism to broad fold sequences lacking metamorphism. However, evidence from sedimentary relationships and the absolute dating of igneous rocks cutting across sedimentary layers allow for the inference of the relative ages given above. Additional data from the dating of metamorphosed layers provide bracket ages for the timing of exhumation of the Magallanes Basin, and suggest that this basin, as well as the Andean fold-thrust belt, were exhumed from below the surface between 10 and 4 million years ago.

The Antarctic Plate started to subduct beneath South American 14 million years ago in the Miocene epoch. At first it subducted only in the southernmost tip of Patagonia, meaning that the Chile Triple Junction lay near the Strait of Magellan. As the southern part of the Nazca Plate and the Chile Rise became consumed by subduction the more northerly regions of the Antarctic Plate began to subduct beneath Patagonia so that the Chile Triple Junction lies at present offshore Taitao Peninsula at 46°15' S.

As the Andes rose in the Middle Miocene (14–12 million years ago) a rain shadow developed to the east giving origin to the Patagonian Desert.

=== Quaternary tectonics ===
The eastern coast of Patagonia has experienced some considerable uplift during the Pleistocene as evidenced by marine terraces and beaches found above sea level. Uplift rates eastern coast of Patagonia exceeds those of the Atlantic coast of South America (except Recife). Uplift in Patagonia contrast starkly with the Río de la Plata which has been a region of subsidence. The causes of the uplift trend have been attributed to a decreased downward drag induced by flow in Earth's mantle beneath Patagonia. This change is in turn derived from the geologically recent subduction of the Antarctic Plate beneath South America, which as a new subducting plate with a short subducting slab, would have less capacity to induce flow in Earth's mantle.
