= Chaitenia =

Distinct fragment of Earth's crust in Chile

Chaitenia is a distinct fragment of Earth's crust in southern Chile. Rocks of Chaitenia represents an ancient island arc that existed next to Patagonia which became eventually accreted to it. The accretion of Chaitenia to Patagonia occurred in the Devonian period (c. 400–360 million years ago) as inferred from an event where rocks were put under pressure, deformed and heated dated to that period. After merging into Patagonia, accretionary complexes developed west of it, meaning Chaitenia constituted a backstop. Chaitenia is not thought to extend beyond the Huincul lineament to the north, beyond which lies the Chilenia terrane.
