= GFZ =

GFZ may refer to:

- Gastre Fault Zone, a geological region of Chile
- GFZ German Research Centre for Geosciences, commonly referred to as "GFZ"
