= Devonian =

Fourth period of the Paleozoic Era

- 419.62 ± 1.36 – 358.86 ± 0.4 Ma
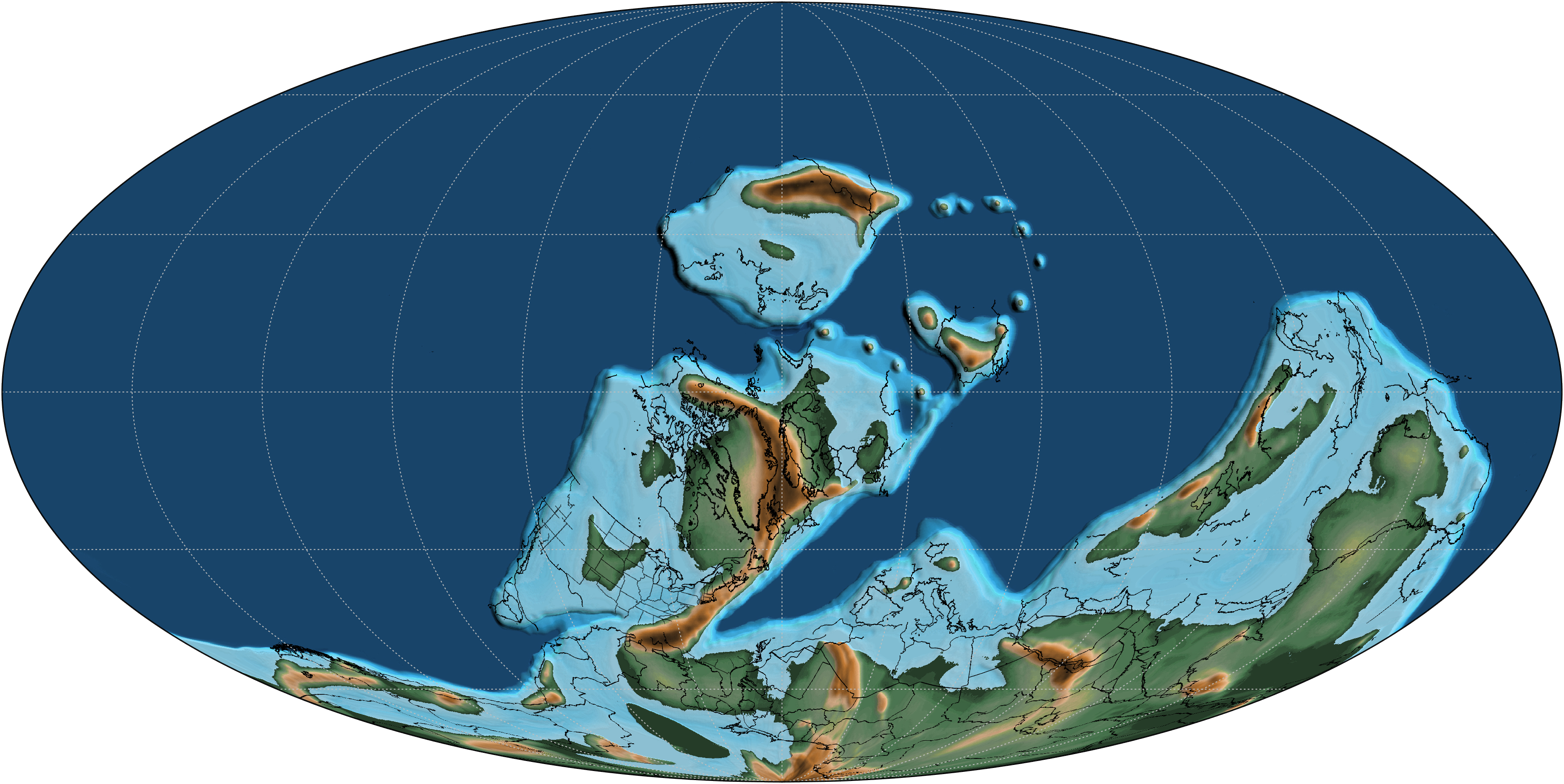
- A map of Earth as it appeared 390 million years ago during the Middle Devonian Epoch

Chronology
| ← / Hangenberg event, Famennian glaciation; ← / Kellwasser event (Late Devonian mass extinction); ← / Widespread shrubs & trees; ← / Hunsrück fauna; ← / Rhynie chert |
Subdivision of the Devonian according to the ICS, as of 2024; Vertical axis scale: Millions of years ago

Etymology
- Name formality: Formal
- Nickname(s): Age of Fishes

Usage information
- Celestial body: Earth
- Regional usage: Global (ICS)
- Time scale(s) used: ICS Time Scale

Definition
- Chronological unit: Period
- Stratigraphic unit: System
- Time span formality: Formal
- Lower boundary definition: FAD of the Graptolite Uncinatograptus uniformis
- Lower boundary GSSP: Klonk, Czech Republic; 49.8550°N 13.7920°E
- Lower GSSP ratified: 1972
- Upper boundary definition: FAD of the Conodont Siphonodella sulcata (discovered to have biostratigraphic issues as of 2006).
- Upper boundary GSSP: La Serre, Montagne Noire, France; 43.5555°N 3.3573°E
- Upper GSSP ratified: 1990

Atmospheric and climatic data
- Sea level above present day: Relatively steady around 189 m, gradually falling to 120 m through period

The Devonian (/dəˈvoʊni.ən, dɛ-/ də-VOH-nee-ən, deh-) is a geologic period and system of the Paleozoic era during the Phanerozoic eon, spanning 60.7 million years from the end of the preceding Silurian period at 419.62 million years ago (Ma), to the beginning of the succeeding Carboniferous period at 358.86 Ma. It is the fourth period of both the Paleozoic and the Phanerozoic. It is named after Devon, South West England, where rocks from this period were first studied.

The first significant evolutionary radiation of life on land occurred during the Devonian, as free-sporing land plants (pteridophytes) began to spread across dry land, forming extensive coal forests which covered the continents. By the middle of the Devonian, several groups of vascular plants had evolved leaves and true roots, and by the end of the period the first seed-bearing plants (pteridospermatophytes) appeared. This rapid evolution and colonization process, which had begun during the Silurian, is known as the Silurian-Devonian Terrestrial Revolution. The earliest land animals, predominantly arthropods such as myriapods, arachnids and hexapods, also became well-established early in this period, after beginning their colonization of land at least from the Ordovician Period.

Fish, especially jawed fish, reached substantial diversity during this time, leading the Devonian to be called the Age of Fishes. The armored placoderms began dominating almost every known aquatic environment. In the oceans, cartilaginous fishes such as primitive sharks became more numerous than in the Silurian and Late Ordovician. Tetrapodomorphs, which include the ancestors of all four-limbed vertebrates (i.e. tetrapods), began diverging from freshwater lobe-finned fish as their more robust and muscled pectoral and pelvic fins gradually evolved into forelimbs and hindlimbs, though they were not fully established for life on land until the Late Carboniferous.

The first ammonites, a subclass of cephalopod molluscs, appeared. Trilobites, brachiopods and the great coral reefs were still common during the Devonian. The Late Devonian extinction, which started about 375 Ma, severely affected marine life, killing off most of the reef systems, most of the jawless fishes, the placoderms, and nearly all trilobites save for a few species of the order Proetida. The subsequent end-Devonian extinction, which occurred at around 359 Ma, further impacted the ecosystems and completed the extinction of all calcite sponge reefs and placoderms.

Devonian palaeogeography was dominated by the supercontinent Gondwana to the south, the small continent of Siberia to the north, and the medium-sized continent of Laurussia to the east. Major tectonic events include the closure of the Rheic Ocean, the separation of South China from Gondwana, and the resulting expansion of the Paleo-Tethys Ocean. The Devonian experienced several major mountain-building events as Laurussia and Gondwana approached; these include the Acadian Orogeny in North America and the beginning of the Variscan Orogeny in Europe. These early collisions preceded the formation of the single supercontinent Pangaea in the Late Paleozoic.

== History ==
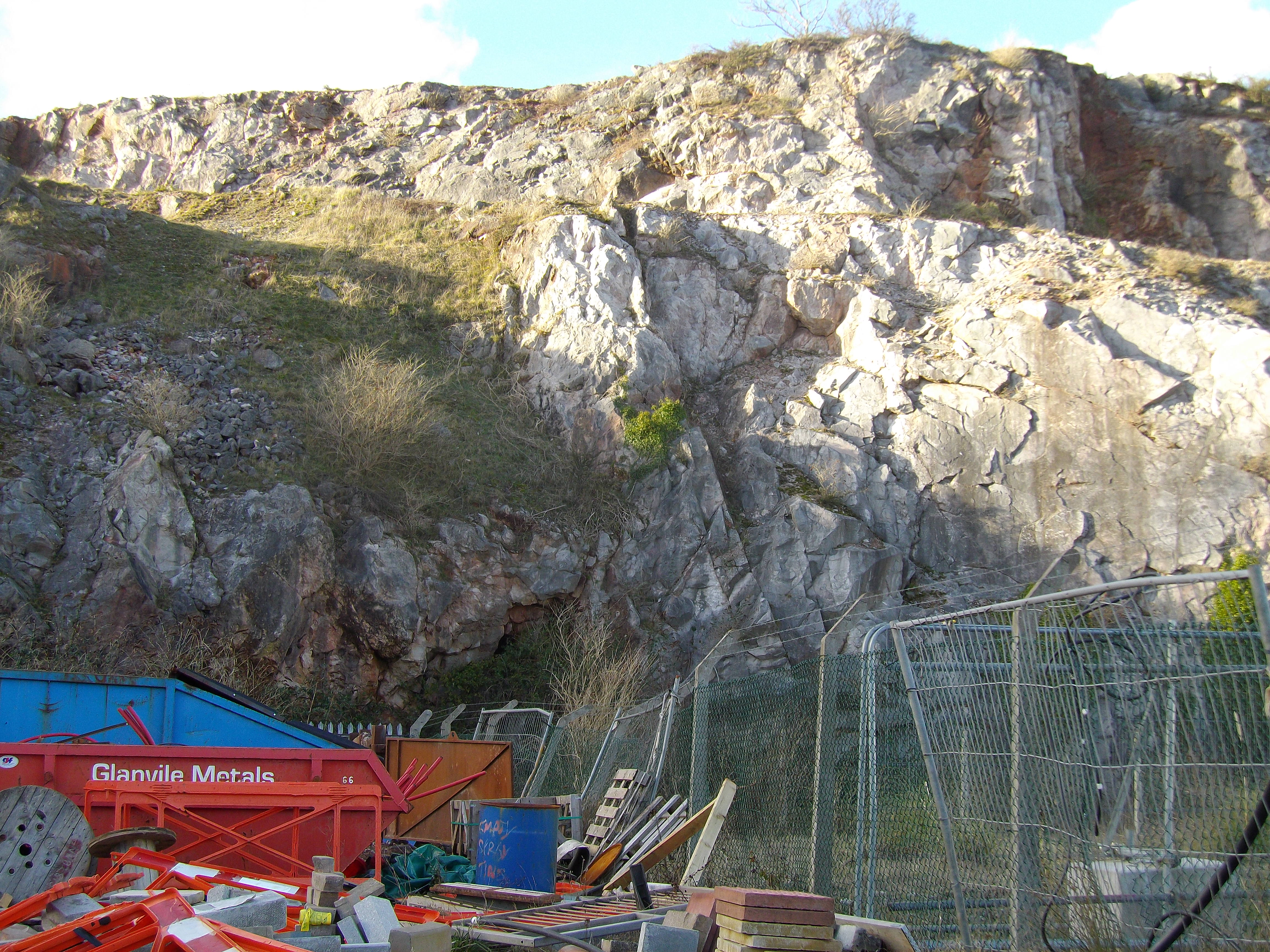
The rocks of Lummaton Quarry in Torquay in Devon played an early role in defining the Devonian Period

The period is named after Devon, a county in southwestern England, where a controversial argument in the 1830s over the age and structure of the rocks found throughout the county was resolved by adding the Devonian Period to the geological timescale. The Great Devonian Controversy was a lengthy debate between Roderick Murchison, Adam Sedgwick and Henry De la Beche over the naming of the period. Murchison and Sedgwick won the debate and named it the Devonian System. (Note: Sedgwick and Murchison coined the term "Devonian system" in 1840: "We propose therefore, for the future, to designate these groups collectively by the name Devonian system". Sedgwick and Murchison acknowledged William Lonsdale's role in proposing, on the basis of fossil evidence, the existence of a Devonian stratum between those of the Silurian and Carboniferous periods: "Again, Mr. Lonsdale, after an extensive examination of the fossils of South Devon, had pronounced them, more than a year since, to form a group intermediate between those of the Carboniferous and Silurian systems". William Lonsdale stated that in December 1837 he had suggested the existence of a stratum between the Silurian and Carboniferous ones: "Mr. Austen's communication [was] read December 1837 ... . It was immediately after the reading of that paper ... that I formed the opinion relative to the limestones of Devonshire being of the age of the old red sandstone; and which I afterwards suggested first to Mr. Murchison and then to Prof. Sedgwick".)

While the rock beds that define the start and end of the Devonian Period are well identified, the exact dates are uncertain. According to the International Commission on Stratigraphy, the Devonian extends from the end of the Silurian 419.62 Ma, to the beginning of the Carboniferous 358.86 Ma – in North America, at the beginning of the Mississippian subperiod of the Carboniferous.

In 19th-century texts, the Devonian has been called the "Old Red Age", after the red and brown terrestrial deposits known in Great Britain as the Old Red Sandstone in which early fossil discoveries were found. Another common term is "Age of the Fishes", referring to the evolution of several major groups of fishes that took place during the period. Older literature on the Anglo-Welsh basin divides it into the Downtonian, Dittonian, Breconian, and Farlovian stages, the latter three of which are placed in the Devonian.

The Devonian has also erroneously been characterised as a "greenhouse age", due to sampling bias: most of the early Devonian-age discoveries came from the strata of Western Europe and eastern North America, which at the time straddled the Equator as part of the supercontinent of Euramerica where fossil signatures of widespread reefs indicate tropical climates that were warm and moderately humid. In fact, the climate in the Devonian differed greatly during its epochs and between geographic regions. For example, during the Early Devonian, arid conditions were prevalent through much of the world including Siberia, Australia, North America, and China, but Africa and South America had a warm temperate climate. In the Late Devonian, by contrast, arid conditions were less prevalent across the world and temperate climates were more common.

== Subdivisions ==
The Devonian Period is formally broken into Early, Middle and Late subdivisions. The rocks corresponding to those epochs are referred to as belonging to the Lower, Middle and Upper parts of the Devonian System.

=== Early Devonian ===
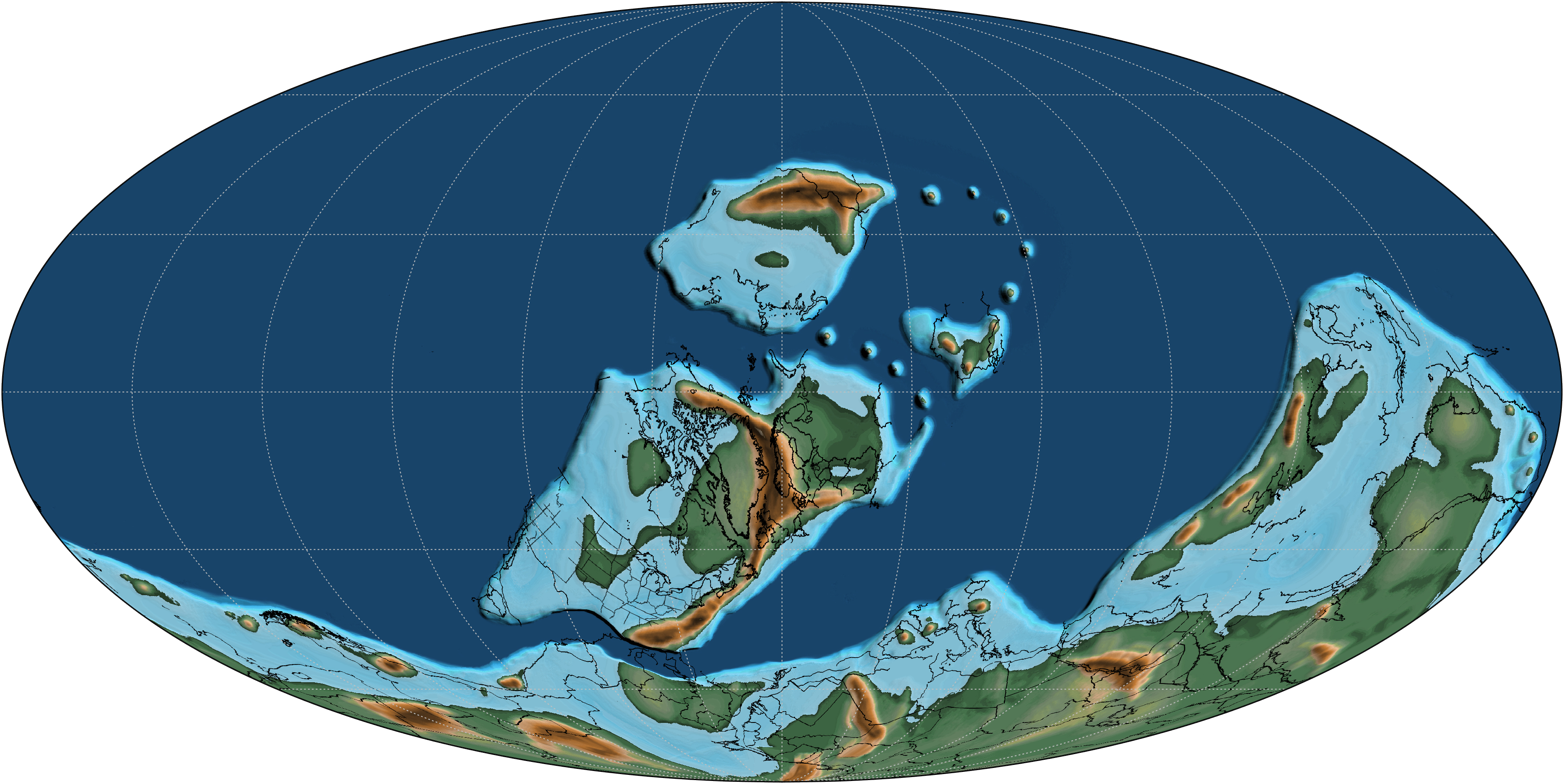
A map of Earth in the Emsian stage of the Early Devonian (405 million years ago)

The Early Devonian lasted from 419.62 to 393.47 Ma. It began with the Lochkovian Stage from 419.62 to 413.02 Ma, which was followed by the Pragian from 413.02 to 410.62 Ma and then by the Emsian, which lasted until the Middle Devonian began at 393.47 Ma. During this time, the first ammonoids appeared, descending from bactritoid nautiloids. Ammonoids during this time period were simple and differed little from their nautiloid counterparts. These ammonoids belong to the order Agoniatitida, which in later epochs evolved to new ammonoid orders, for example Goniatitida and Clymeniida. This class of cephalopod molluscs would dominate the marine fauna until the beginning of the Mesozoic Era.

=== Middle Devonian ===
The Middle Devonian comprised two subdivisions: first the Eifelian, which then gave way to the Givetian at 387.95 Ma. During this time, the jawless agnathan fishes began to decline in diversity in freshwater and marine environments partly due to drastic environmental changes and partly due to the increasing competition, predation, and diversity of jawed fishes. The shallow, warm, oxygen-depleted waters of Devonian inland lakes, surrounded by primitive plants, provided the environment necessary for certain early fish to develop such essential characteristics as well developed lungs and the ability to crawl out of the water and onto the land for short periods of time.

=== Late Devonian ===
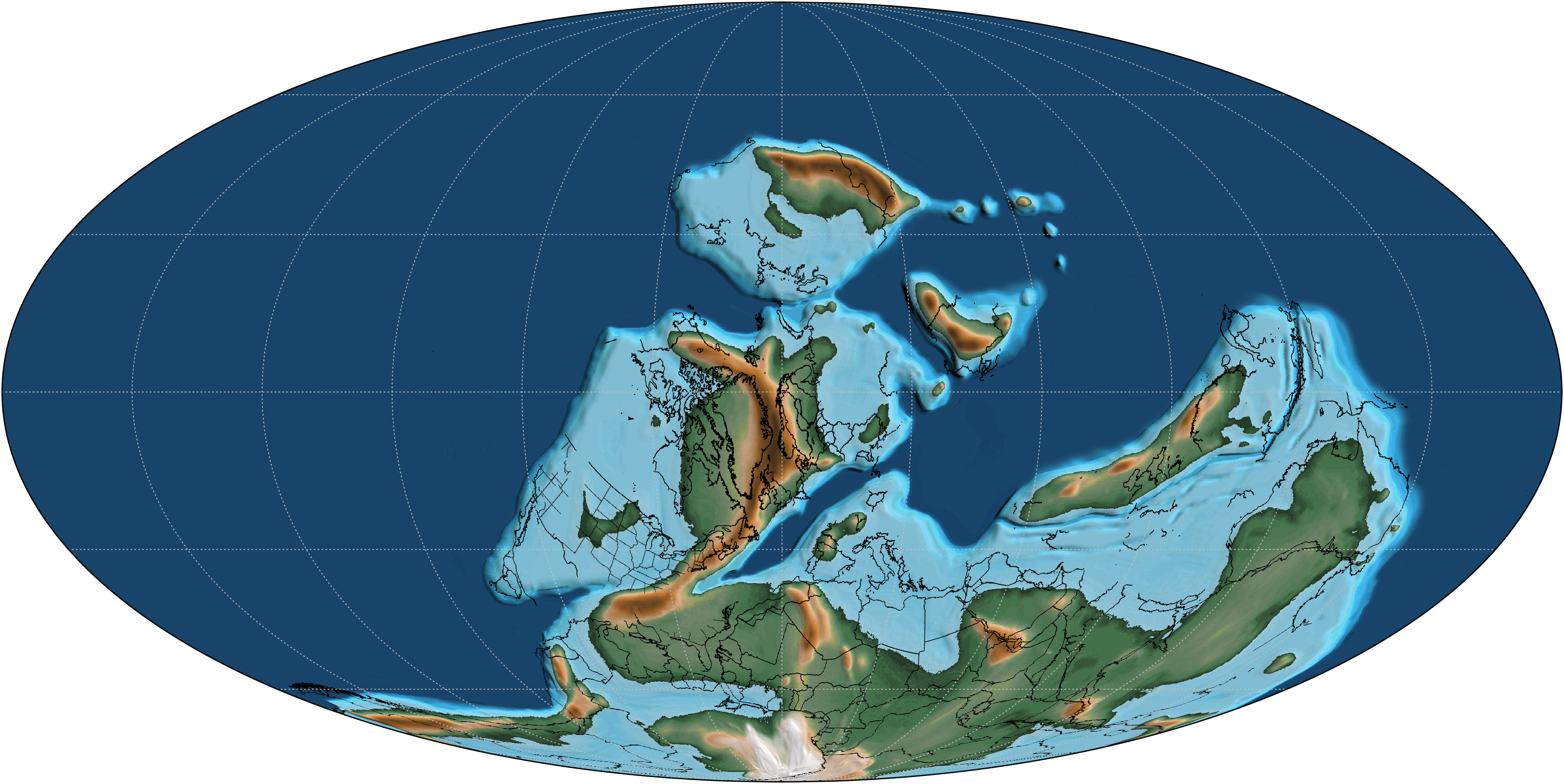
A map of Earth in the Famennian stage of the Late Devonian (370 million years ago)

Finally, the Late Devonian started with the Frasnian, from 382.31 to 372.15 Ma, during which the first forests took shape on land. The first tetrapods appeared in the fossil record in the ensuing Famennian subdivision, the beginning and end of which are marked with extinction events. This lasted until the end of the Devonian at 358.86 Ma.

== Climate ==
The Devonian was a relatively warm period, although significant glaciers may have existed during the Early and Middle Devonian. The temperature gradient from the equator to the poles was not as large as it is today. The weather was also very arid, mostly along the equator where it was the driest. Reconstruction of tropical sea surface temperature from conodont apatite implies an average value of 30 °C (86 °F) in the Early Devonian. Early Devonian mean annual surface temperatures were approximately 16 °C. CO_{2} levels dropped steeply throughout the Devonian Period. The newly evolved forests drew carbon out of the atmosphere, which were then buried into sediments. This may be reflected by a Mid-Devonian cooling of around 5 °C (9 °F). The Late Devonian warmed to levels equivalent to the Early Devonian; while there is no corresponding increase in CO_{2} concentrations, continental weathering increases (as predicted by warmer temperatures); further, a range of evidence, such as plant distribution, points to a Late Devonian warming. The climate would have affected the dominant organisms in reefs; microbes would have been the main reef-forming organisms in warm periods, with corals and stromatoporoid sponges taking the dominant role in cooler times. The warming at the end of the Devonian may even have contributed to the extinction of the stromatoporoids. At the terminus of the Devonian, Earth rapidly cooled into an icehouse, marking the beginning of the Late Paleozoic icehouse.

== Paleogeography ==
The Devonian world involved many continents and ocean basins of various sizes. The largest continent, Gondwana, was located entirely within the Southern Hemisphere. It corresponds to modern day South America, Africa, Australia, Antarctica, and India, as well as minor components of North America and Asia. The second-largest continent, Laurussia, was northwest of Gondwana, and corresponds to much of modern-day North America and Europe. Various smaller continents, microcontinents, and terranes were present east of Laurussia and north of Gondwana, corresponding to parts of Europe and Asia. The Devonian Period was a time of great tectonic activity, as the major continents of Laurussia and Gondwana drew closer together.

Sea levels were high worldwide, and much of the land lay under shallow seas, where tropical reef organisms lived. The enormous "world ocean", Panthalassa, occupied much of the Northern Hemisphere as well as wide swathes east of Gondwana and west of Laurussia. Other minor oceans were the Paleo-Tethys Ocean and Rheic Ocean.

=== Laurussia ===
Continental boundary of Laurussia (Euramerica) and its constituents, superimposed onto modern coastlines

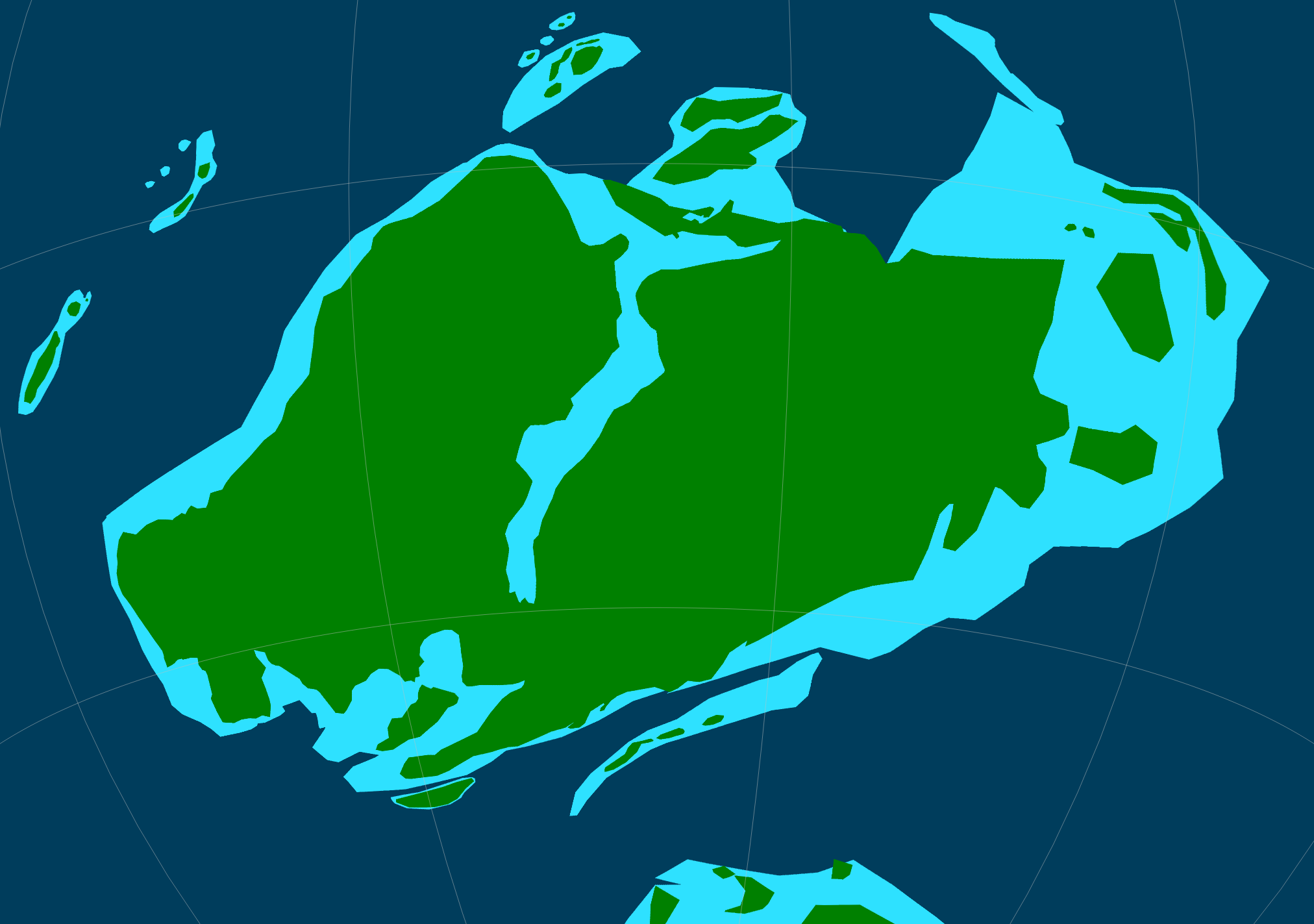
Euramerica at 410 million years ago with exposed landmass in green. Below the image is the Amazonian continent, part of Gondwana

By the early Devonian, the continent Laurussia (also known as Euramerica) was fully formed through the collision of the continents Laurentia (modern day North America) and Baltica (modern day northern and eastern Europe). The tectonic effects of this collision continued into the Devonian, producing a string of mountain ranges along the southeastern coast of the continent. In present-day eastern North America, the Acadian Orogeny continued to raise the Appalachian Mountains. Further east, the collision also extended the rise of the Caledonian Mountains of Great Britain and Scandinavia. As the Caledonian Orogeny wound down in the later part of the period, orogenic collapse facilitated a cluster of granite intrusions in Scotland.

Most of Laurussia was located south of the equator, but in the Devonian it moved northwards and began to rotate counterclockwise towards its modern position. While the most northern parts of the continent (such as Greenland and Ellesmere Island) established tropical conditions, most of the continent was located within the natural dry zone along the Tropic of Capricorn, which (as nowadays) is a result of the convergence of two great air-masses, the Hadley cell and the Ferrel cell. In these near-deserts, the Old Red Sandstone sedimentary beds formed, made red by the oxidised iron (hematite) characteristic of drought conditions. The abundance of red sandstone on continental land also lends Laurussia the name "the Old Red Continent". For much of the Devonian, the majority of western Laurussia (North America) was covered by subtropical inland seas which hosted a diverse ecosystem of reefs and marine life. Devonian marine deposits are particularly prevalent in the midwestern and northeastern United States. Devonian reefs also extended along the southeast edge of Laurussia, a coastline now corresponding to southern England, Belgium, and other mid-latitude areas of Europe.

In the Early and Middle Devonian, the west coast of Laurussia was a passive margin with broad coastal waters, deep silty embayments, river deltas and estuaries, found today in Idaho and Nevada. In the Late Devonian, an approaching volcanic island arc reached the steep slope of the continental shelf and began to uplift deep water deposits. This minor collision sparked the start of a mountain-building episode called the Antler orogeny, which extended into the Carboniferous. Mountain building could also be found in the far northeastern extent of the continent, as minor tropical island arcs and detached Baltic terranes re-join the continent. Deformed remnants of these mountains can still be found on Ellesmere Island and Svalbard. Many of the Devonian collisions in Laurussia produce both mountain chains and foreland basins, which are frequently fossiliferous.

=== Gondwana ===
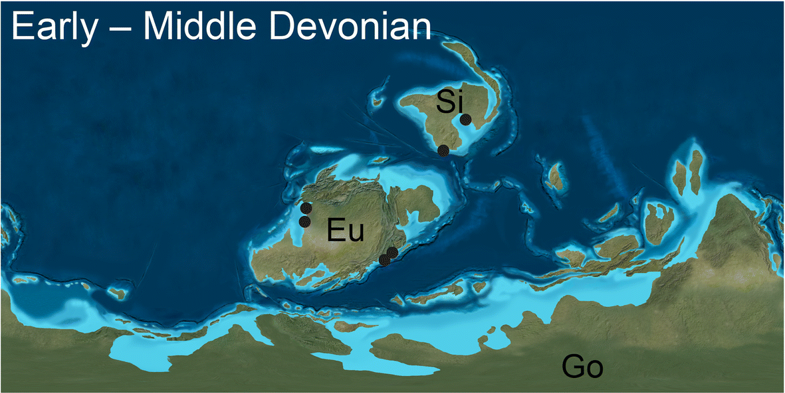
The Early-Middle Devonian world, with major continents Gondwana (Go), Euramerica/Laurussia (Eu), and Siberia (Si)

Gondwana was by far the largest continent on the planet. It was completely south of the equator, although the northeastern sector (now Australia) did reach tropical latitudes. The southwestern sector (now South America) was located to the far south, with Brazil situated near the South Pole. The northwestern edge of Gondwana was an active margin for much of the Devonian, and saw the accretion of many smaller land masses and island arcs. These include Chilenia, Cuyania, and Chaitenia, which now form much of Chile and Patagonia. These collisions were associated with volcanic activity and plutons, but by the Late Devonian the tectonic situation had relaxed and much of South America was covered by shallow seas. These south polar seas hosted a distinctive brachiopod fauna, the Malvinokaffric Realm, which extended eastward to marginal areas now equivalent to South Africa and Antarctica. Malvinokaffric faunas even managed to approach the South Pole via a tongue of Panthalassa which extended into the Paraná Basin.

The northern rim of Gondwana was mostly a passive margin, hosting extensive marine deposits in areas such as northwest Africa and Tibet. The eastern margin, though warmer than the west, was equally active. Numerous mountain building events and granite and kimberlite intrusions affected areas equivalent to modern day eastern Australia, Tasmania, and Antarctica.

=== Asian terranes ===
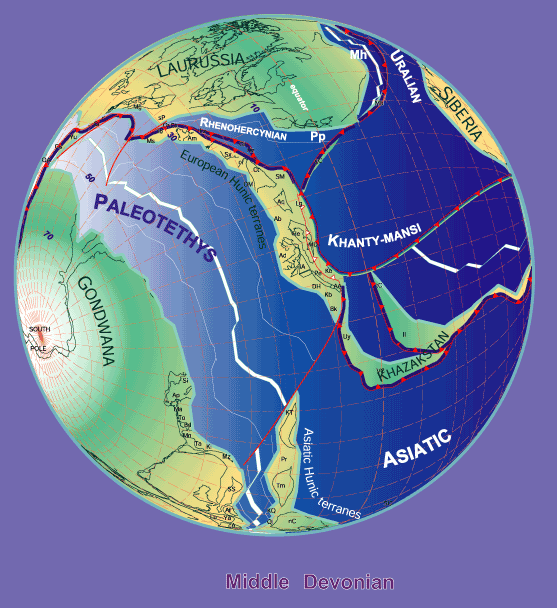
The earth at 380 Ma, centered on the Paleo-Tethys Ocean, which fully opened during the Devonian

Several island microcontinents (which would later coalesce into modern day Asia) stretched over a low-latitude archipelago to the north of Gondwana. They were separated from the southern continent by an oceanic basin: the Paleo-Tethys. Although the western Paleo-Tethys Ocean had existed since the Cambrian, the eastern part only began to rift apart as late as the Silurian. This process accelerated in the Devonian. The eastern branch of the Paleo-Tethys was fully opened when South China and Annamia (a terrane equivalent to most of Indochina), together as a unified continent, detached from the northeastern sector of Gondwana. Nevertheless, they remained close enough to Gondwana that their Devonian fossils were more closely related to Australian species than to north Asian species. Other Asian terranes remained attached to Gondwana, including Sibumasu (western Indochina), Tibet, and the rest of the Cimmerian blocks.

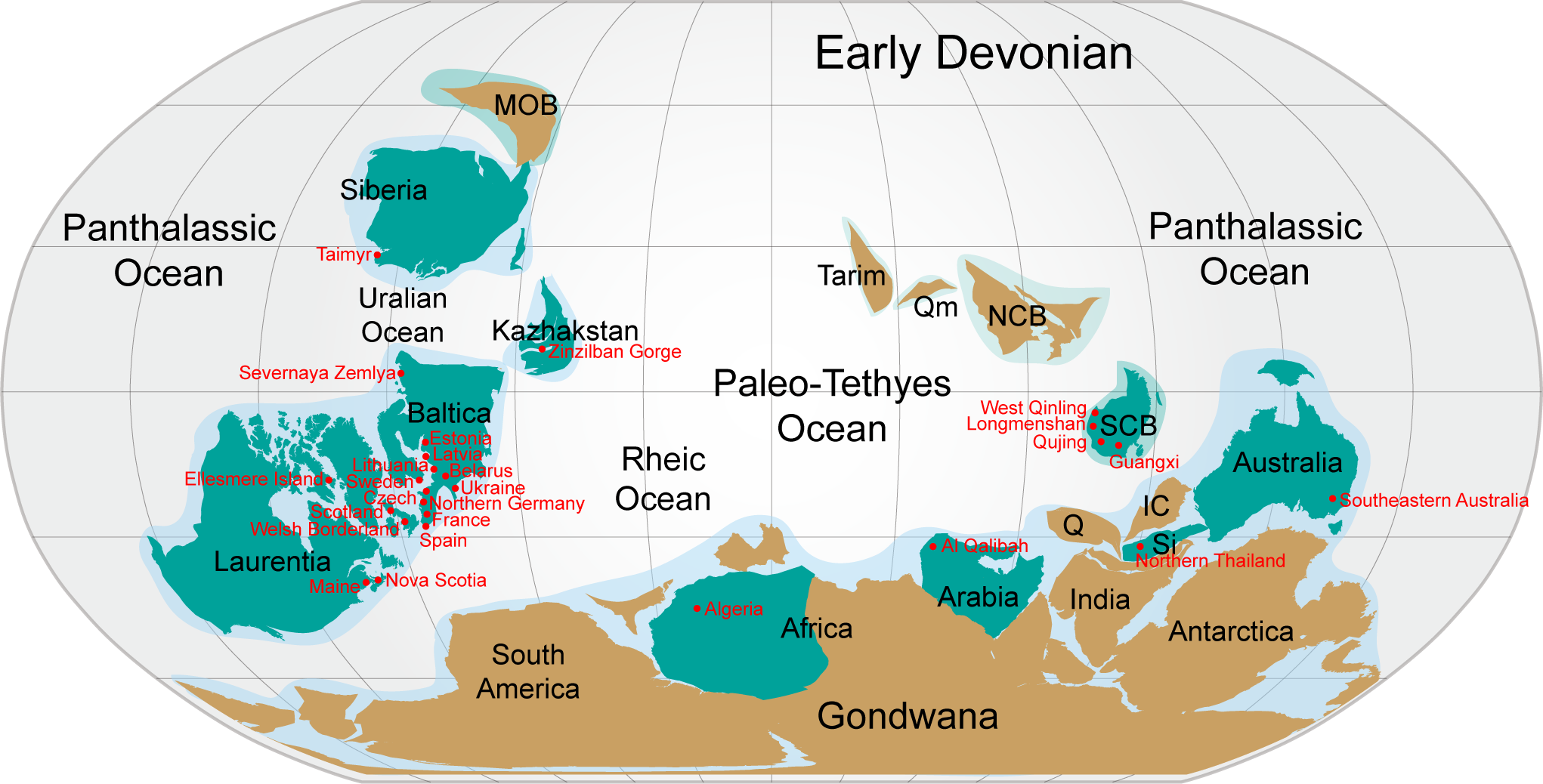
World map at 400 Ma (Early Devonian), showing continents and terranes with modern continent borders superimposed

While the South China-Annamia continent was the newest addition to the Asian microcontinents, it was not the first. North China and the Tarim Block (now northwesternmost China) were located westward and continued to drift northwards, powering over older oceanic crust in the process. Further west was a small ocean (the Turkestan Ocean), followed by the larger microcontinents of Kazakhstania, Siberia, and Amuria. Kazakhstania was a volcanically active region during the Devonian, as it continued to assimilate smaller island arcs. The island arcs of the region, such as the Balkhash-West Junggar Arc, exhibited biological endemism as a consequence of their location.

Siberia was located just north of the equator as the largest landmass in the Northern Hemisphere. At the beginning of the Devonian, Siberia was inverted (upside down) relative to its modern orientation. Later in the period it moved northwards and began to twist clockwise, though it was not near its modern location. Siberia approached the eastern edge of Laurussia as the Devonian progressed, but it was still separated by a seaway, the Ural Ocean. Although Siberia's margins were generally tectonically stable and ecologically productive, rifting and deep mantle plumes impacted the continent with flood basalts during the Late Devonian. The Altai-Sayan region was shaken by volcanism in the Early and Middle Devonian, while Late Devonian magmatism was magnified further to produce the Vilyuy Traps, flood basalts which may have contributed to the Late Devonian Mass Extinction. The last major round of volcanism, the Yakutsk Large Igneous Province, continued into the Carboniferous to produce extensive kimberlite deposits.

Similar volcanic activity also affected the nearby microcontinent of Amuria (now Manchuria, Mongolia, and their vicinities). Though certainly close to Siberia in the Devonian, the precise location of Amuria is uncertain due to contradictory paleomagnetic data.

=== Closure of the Rheic Ocean ===
The Rheic Ocean, which separated Laurussia from Gondwana, was wide at the start of the Devonian, having formed after the drift of Avalonia away from Gondwana. It steadily shrunk as the period continued, as the two major continents approached near the equator in the early stages of the assembly of Pangaea. The closure of the Rheic Ocean began in the Devonian and continued into the Carboniferous. As the ocean narrowed, endemic marine faunas of Gondwana and Laurussia combined into a single tropical fauna. The history of the western Rheic Ocean is a subject of debate, but there is good evidence that Rheic oceanic crust experienced intense subduction and metamorphism under Mexico and Central America.

The closure of the eastern part of the Rheic Ocean is associated with the assemblage of central and southern Europe. In the early Paleozoic, much of Europe was still attached to Gondwana, including the terranes of Iberia, Armorica (France), Palaeo-Adria (the western Mediterranean area), Bohemia, Franconia, and Saxothuringia. These continental blocks, collectively known as the Armorican Terrane Assemblage, split away from Gondwana in the Silurian and drifted towards Laurussia through the Devonian. Their collision with Laurussia leads to the beginning of the Variscan Orogeny, a major mountain-building event which would escalate further in the Late Paleozoic. Franconia and Saxothuringia collided with Laurussia near the end of the Early Devonian, pinching out the easternmost Rheic Ocean. The rest of the Armorican terranes followed, and by the end of the Devonian they were fully connected with Laurussia. This sequence of rifting and collision events led to the successive creation and destruction of several small seaways, including the Rheno-Hercynian, Saxo-Thuringian, and Galicia-Moldanubian oceans. Their sediments were eventually compressed and completely buried as Gondwana fully collided with Laurussia in the Carboniferous.

== Life ==
=== Marine biota ===
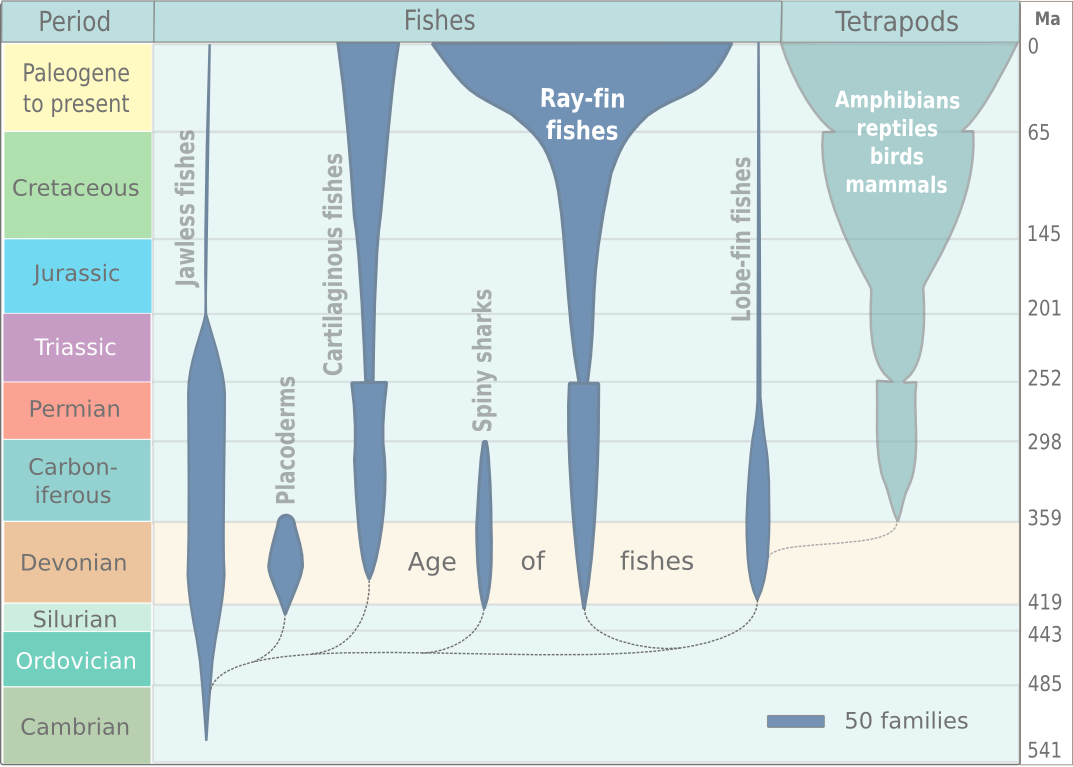
Spindle diagram for the evolution of vertebrates

Sea levels in the Devonian were generally high. Marine faunas continued to be dominated by conodonts, bryozoans, diverse and abundant brachiopods, the enigmatic hederellids, microconchids, and corals. Lily-like crinoids (animals, their resemblance to flowers notwithstanding) were abundant, and trilobites were still fairly common. Bivalves became commonplace in deep water and outer shelf environments. The first ammonites also appeared during or slightly before the early Devonian Period around 400 Ma. Bactritoids make their first appearance in the Early Devonian as well; their radiation, along with that of ammonoids, has been attributed by some authors to increased environmental stress resulting from decreasing oxygen levels in the deeper parts of the water column. Among vertebrates, jawless armored fish (ostracoderms) declined in diversity, while the jawed fish (gnathostomes) simultaneously increased in both the sea and fresh water. Armored placoderms were numerous during the early ages of the Devonian Period and became extinct in the Late Devonian, perhaps because of competition for food against the other fish species. Early cartilaginous (Chondrichthyes) and bony fishes (Osteichthyes) also become diverse and played a large role within the Devonian seas. The first abundant genus of cartilaginous fish, Cladoselache, appeared in the oceans during the Devonian Period. The great diversity of fish around at the time has led to the Devonian being given the name "The Age of Fishes" in popular culture.

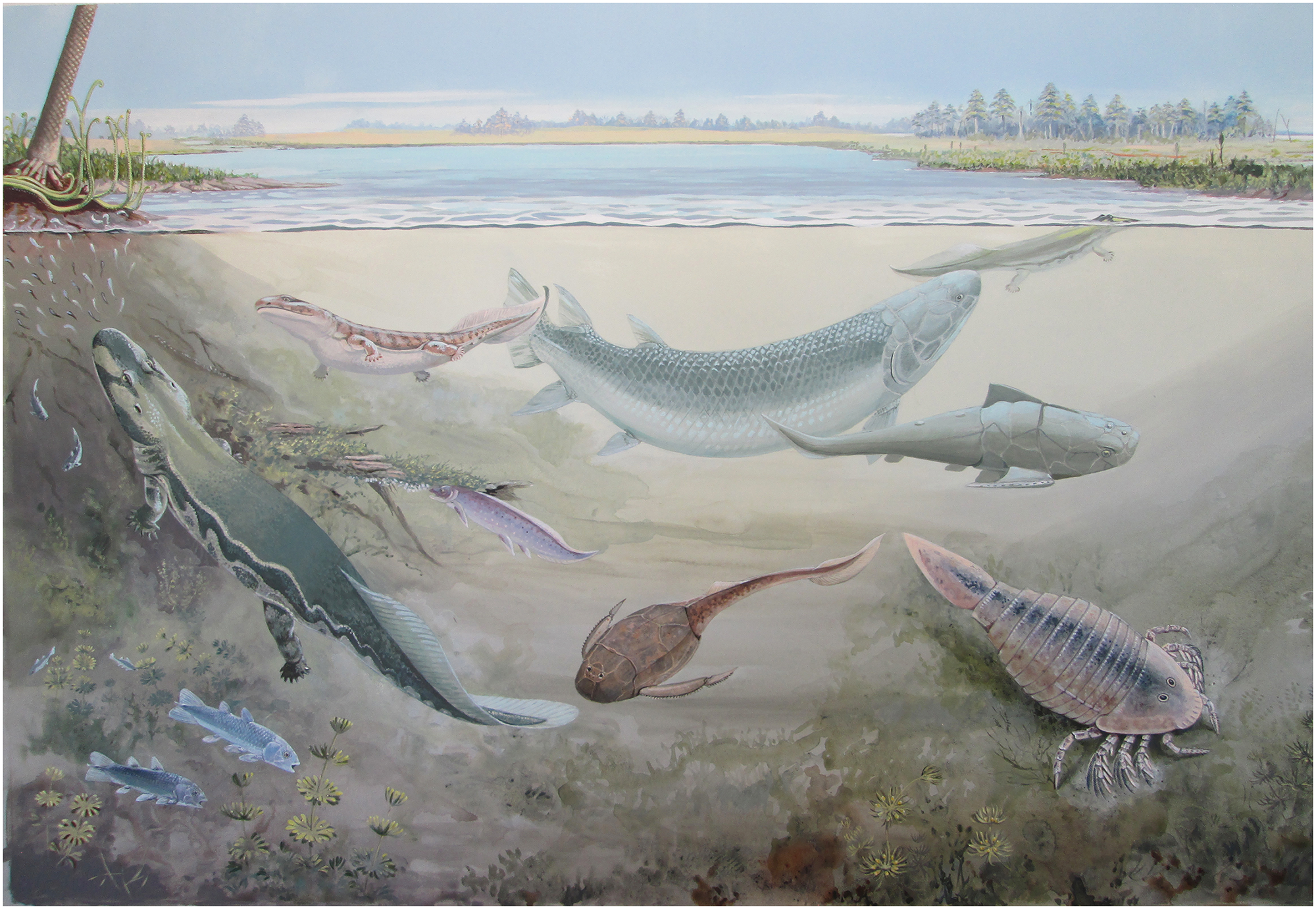
The Devonian period saw the development of early sharks, armoured placoderms and various lobe-finned fishes including the tetrapod transitional species

The Devonian saw significant expansion in the diversity of nektonic marine life driven by the abundance of planktonic microorganisms in the free water column as well as high ecological competition in benthic habitats, which were extremely saturated; this diversification has been labeled the Devonian Nekton Revolution by many researchers. However, other researchers have questioned whether this revolution existed at all; a 2018 study found that although the proportion of biodiversity constituted by nekton increased across the boundary between the Silurian and Devonian, it decreased across the span of the Devonian, particularly during the Pragian, and that the overall diversity of nektonic taxa did not increase significantly during the Devonian compared to during other geologic periods, and was in fact higher during the intervals spanning from the Wenlock to the Lochkovian and from the Carboniferous to the Permian. The study's authors instead attribute the increased overall diversity of nekton in the Devonian to a broader, gradual trend of nektonic diversification across the entire Palaeozoic.

=== Reefs ===
A now-dry barrier reef, located in present-day Kimberley Basin of northwest Australia, once extended 350 km (220 mi), fringing a Devonian continent. Reefs are generally built by various carbonate-secreting organisms that can erect wave-resistant structures near sea level. Although modern reefs are constructed mainly by corals and calcareous algae, Devonian reefs were either microbial reefs built up mostly by autotrophic cyanobacteria or coral-stromatoporoid reefs built up by coral-like stromatoporoids and tabulate and rugose corals. Microbial reefs dominated under the warmer conditions of the early and late Devonian, while coral-stromatoporoid reefs dominated during the cooler middle Devonian.

=== Terrestrial biota ===
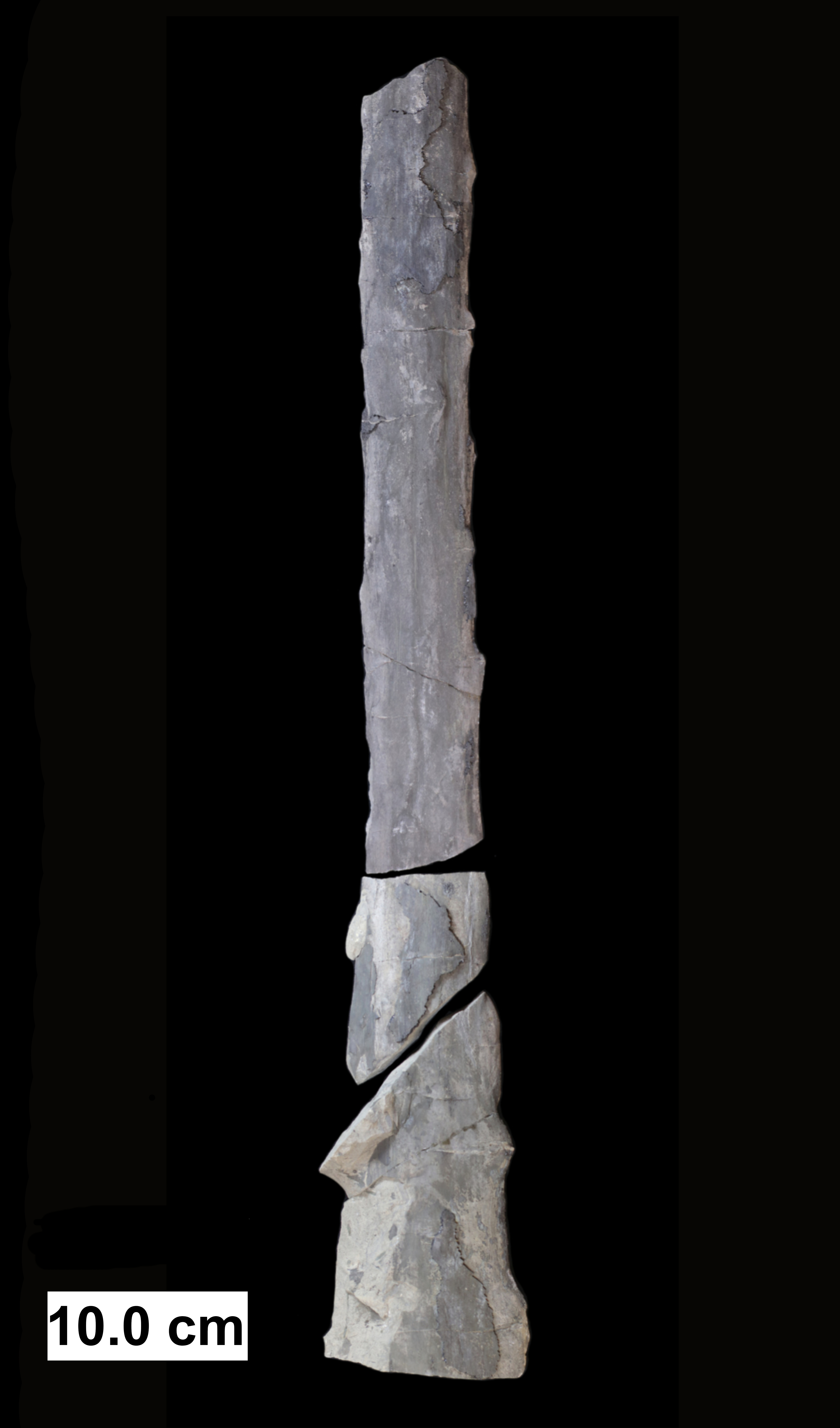
Prototaxites milwaukeensis, the only known member of an unknown kingdom of life, from the Middle Devonian of Wisconsin

By the Devonian Period, life was well underway in its colonization of the land. The moss forests and bacterial and algal mats of the Silurian were joined early in the period by primitive rooted plants that created the first stable soils and harbored arthropods like mites, scorpions, trigonotarbids and myriapods (although arthropods appeared on land much earlier than in the Early Devonian and the existence of fossils such as Protichnites suggest that amphibious arthropods may have appeared as early as the Cambrian). Also the earliest known terrestrial crustaceans, members of the Peracarida, originated in the Devonian. By far the largest land organism at the beginning of this period was the enigmatic Prototaxites, which was possibly the fruiting body of an enormous fungus, rolled liverwort mat, or another organism of uncertain affinities that stood more than 8 metres (26 ft) tall, and towered over the low, carpet-like vegetation during the early part of the Devonian. Also, the first possible fossils of insects appeared around 416 Ma, in the Early Devonian. Evidence for the earliest tetrapods takes the form of trace fossils in shallow lagoon environments within a marine carbonate platform/shelf during the Middle Devonian, although these traces have been questioned and an interpretation as fish feeding traces (Piscichnus) has been advanced.

==== The greening of land ====
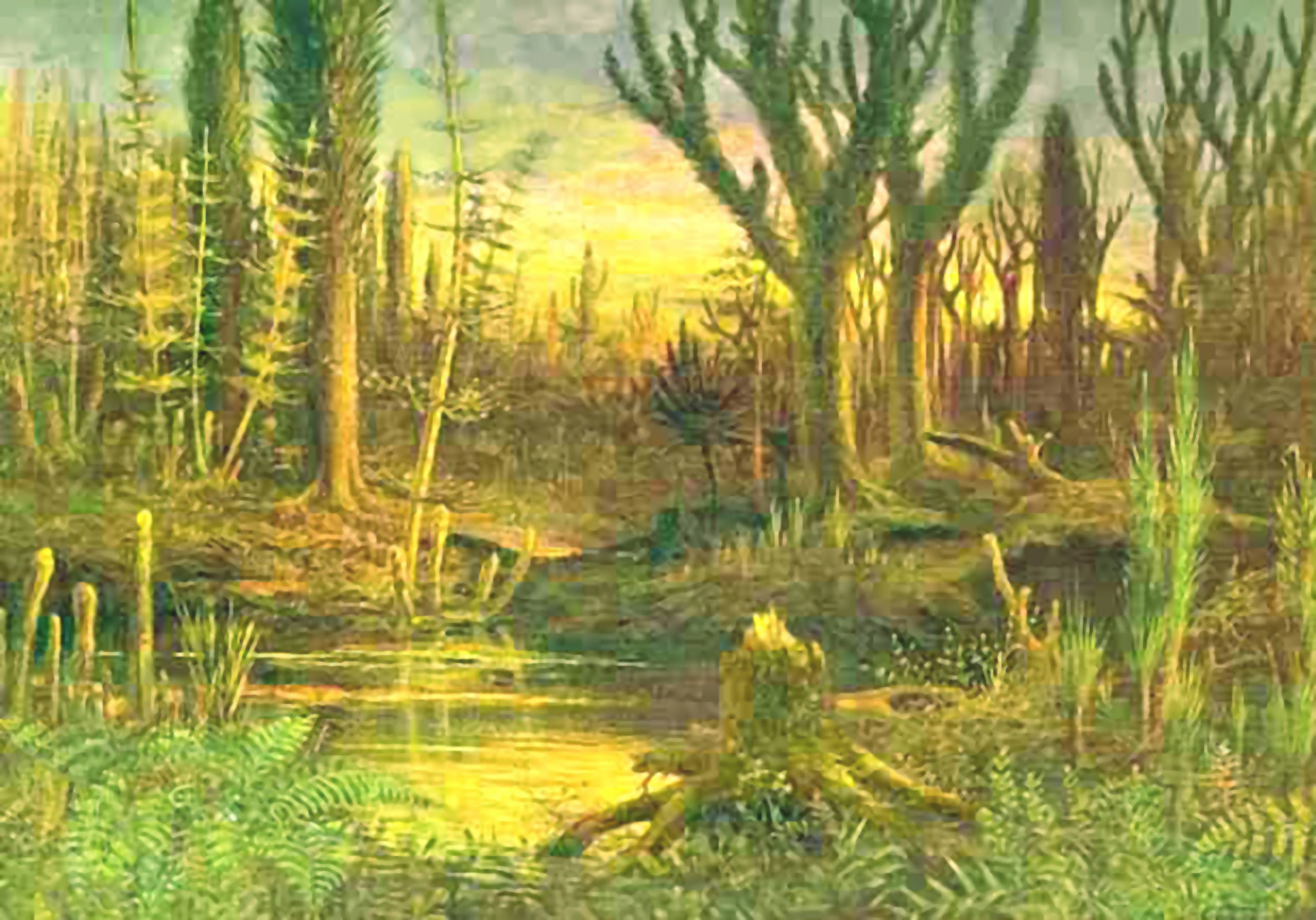
The Devonian Period marks the beginning of extensive land colonization by plants. With large land-dwelling herbivores not yet present, large forests grew and shaped the landscape.

Many Early Devonian plants did not have true roots or leaves like extant plants, although vascular tissue is observed in many of those plants. Some of the early land plants such as Drepanophycus likely spread by vegetative growth and spores. The earliest land plants such as Cooksonia consisted of leafless, dichotomous axes with terminal sporangia and were generally very short-statured, and grew hardly more than a few centimetres tall. Fossils of Armoricaphyton chateaupannense, about 400 million years old, represent the oldest known plants with woody tissue. By the Middle Devonian, shrub-like forests of primitive plants existed: lycophytes, horsetails, ferns, and progymnosperms evolved. Most of these plants had true roots and leaves, and many were quite tall. The earliest-known trees appeared in the Middle Devonian. These included a lineage of lycopods and another arborescent, woody vascular plant, the cladoxylopsids and progymnosperm Archaeopteris. These tracheophytes were able to grow to large size on dry land because they had evolved the ability to biosynthesize lignin, which gave them physical rigidity and improved the effectiveness of their vascular system while giving them resistance to pathogens and herbivores. In Eifelian age, cladoxylopsid trees formed the first forests in Earth history. By the end of the Devonian, the first seed-forming plants had appeared. This rapid appearance of many plant groups and growth forms has been referred to as the Devonian Explosion or the Silurian-Devonian Terrestrial Revolution.

The 'greening' of the continents acted as a carbon sink, and atmospheric concentrations of carbon dioxide may have dropped. This may have cooled the climate and led to a massive extinction event. (See Late Devonian extinction).

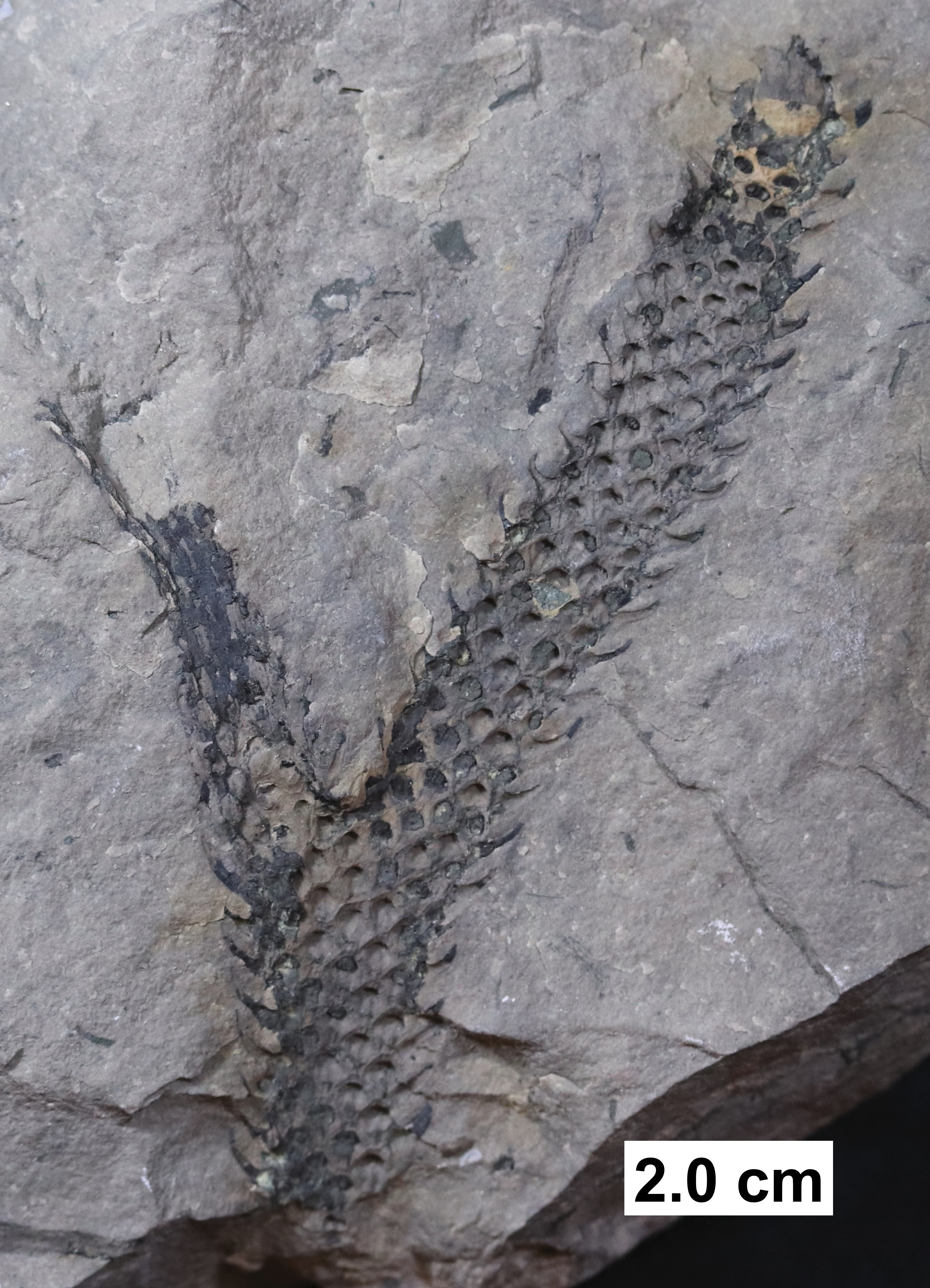
Lycopod axis (branch) from the Middle Devonian of Wisconsin

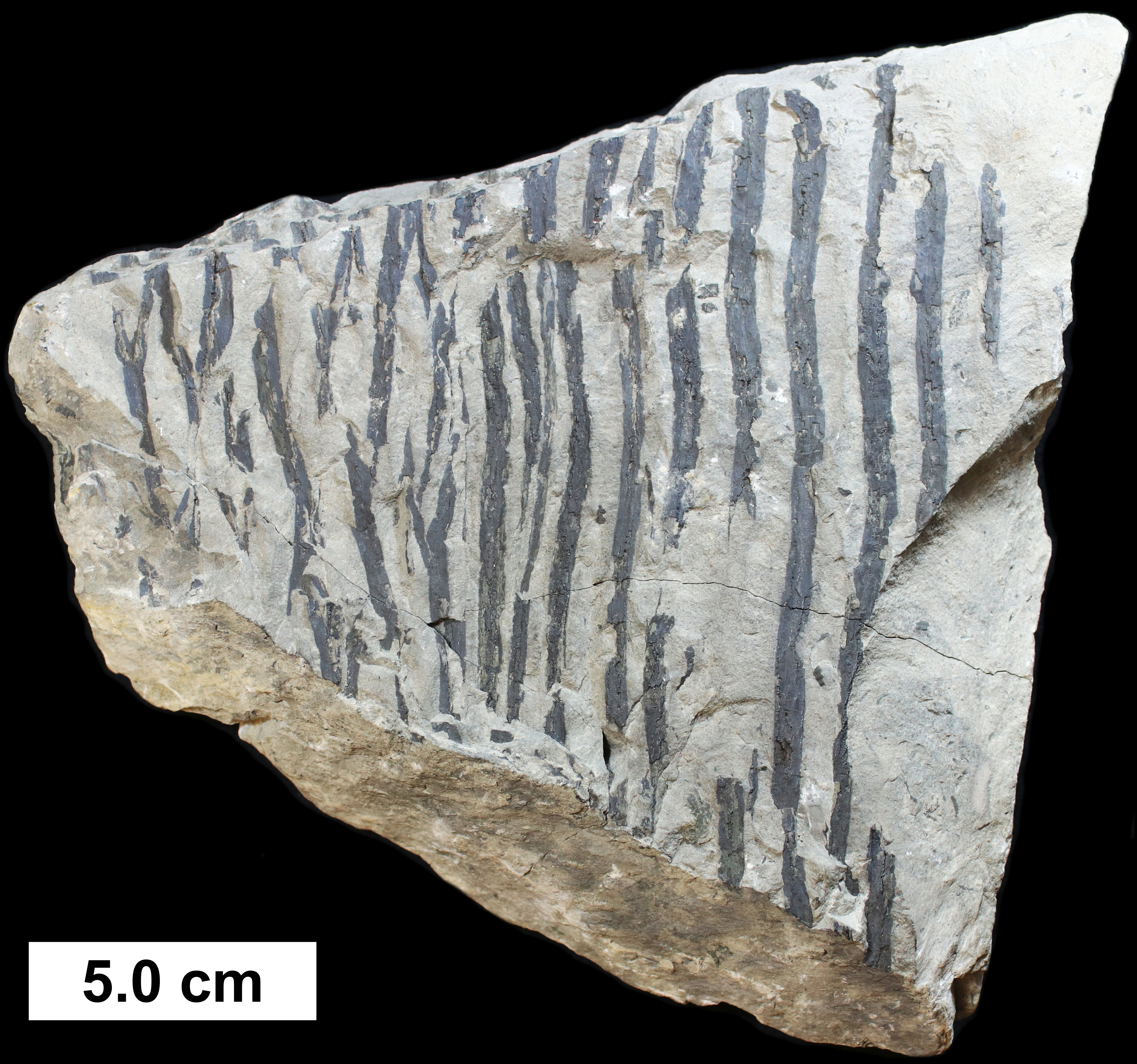
Bark (possibly from a cladoxylopsid) from the Middle Devonian of Wisconsin

==== Animals and the first soils ====
Primitive arthropods co-evolved with this diversified terrestrial vegetation structure. The evolving co-dependence of insects and seed plants that characterized a recognizably modern world had its genesis in the Late Devonian Epoch. The development of soils and plant root systems probably led to changes in the speed and pattern of erosion and sediment deposition. The rapid evolution of a terrestrial ecosystem that contained copious animals opened the way for the first vertebrates to seek terrestrial living. By the end of the Devonian, arthropods were solidly established on the land.

=== Gallery ===
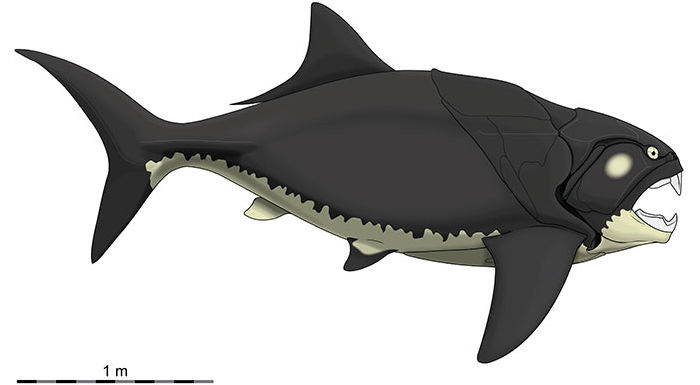
Dunkleosteus, one of the largest armoured fish ever to roam the planet, lived during the Late Devonian

Titanichthys, a planktivorous arthrodire from the Famennian of the Cleveland Shale of Ohio.

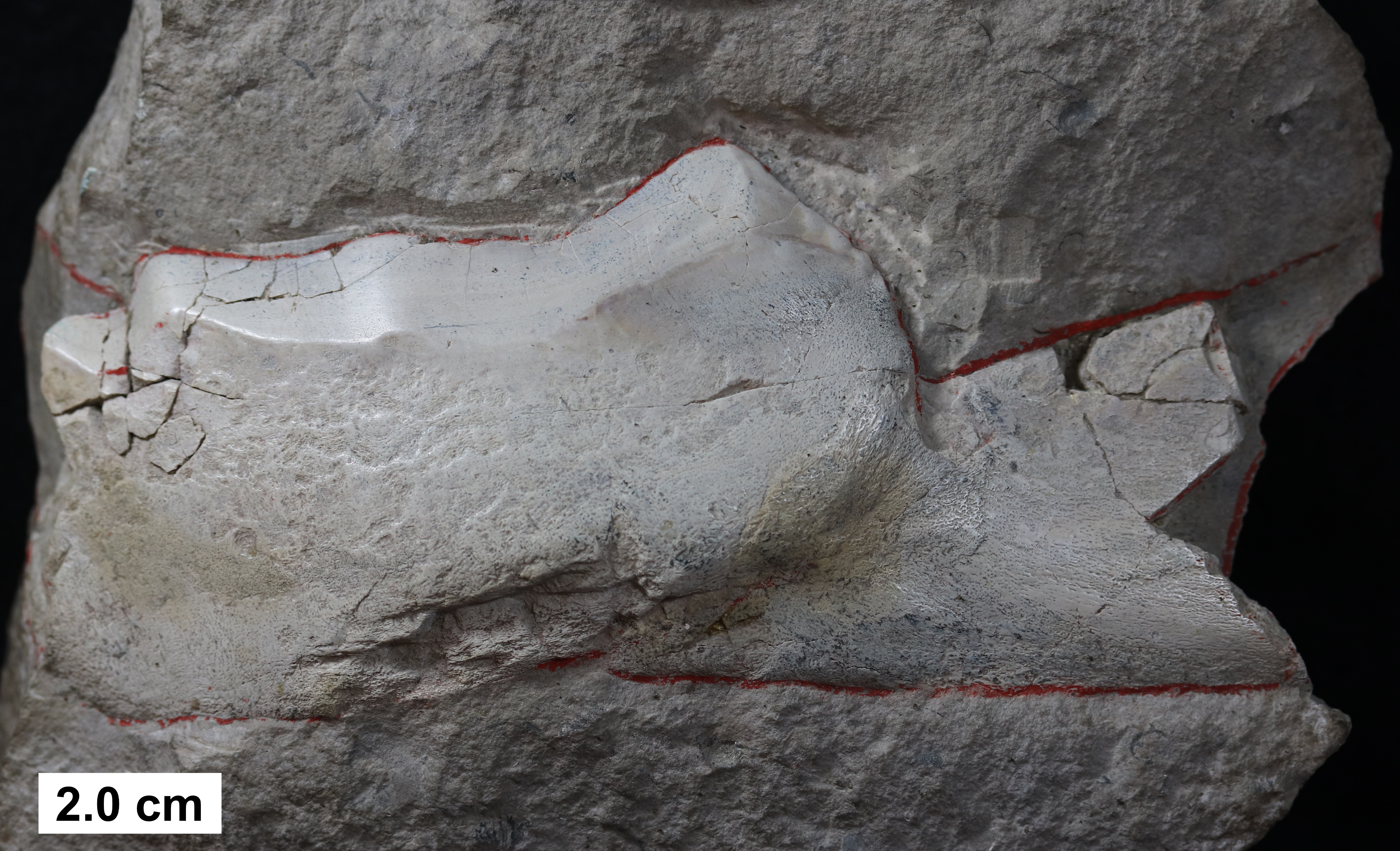
Lower jaw of Eastmanosteus pustulosus from the Middle Devonian of Wisconsin

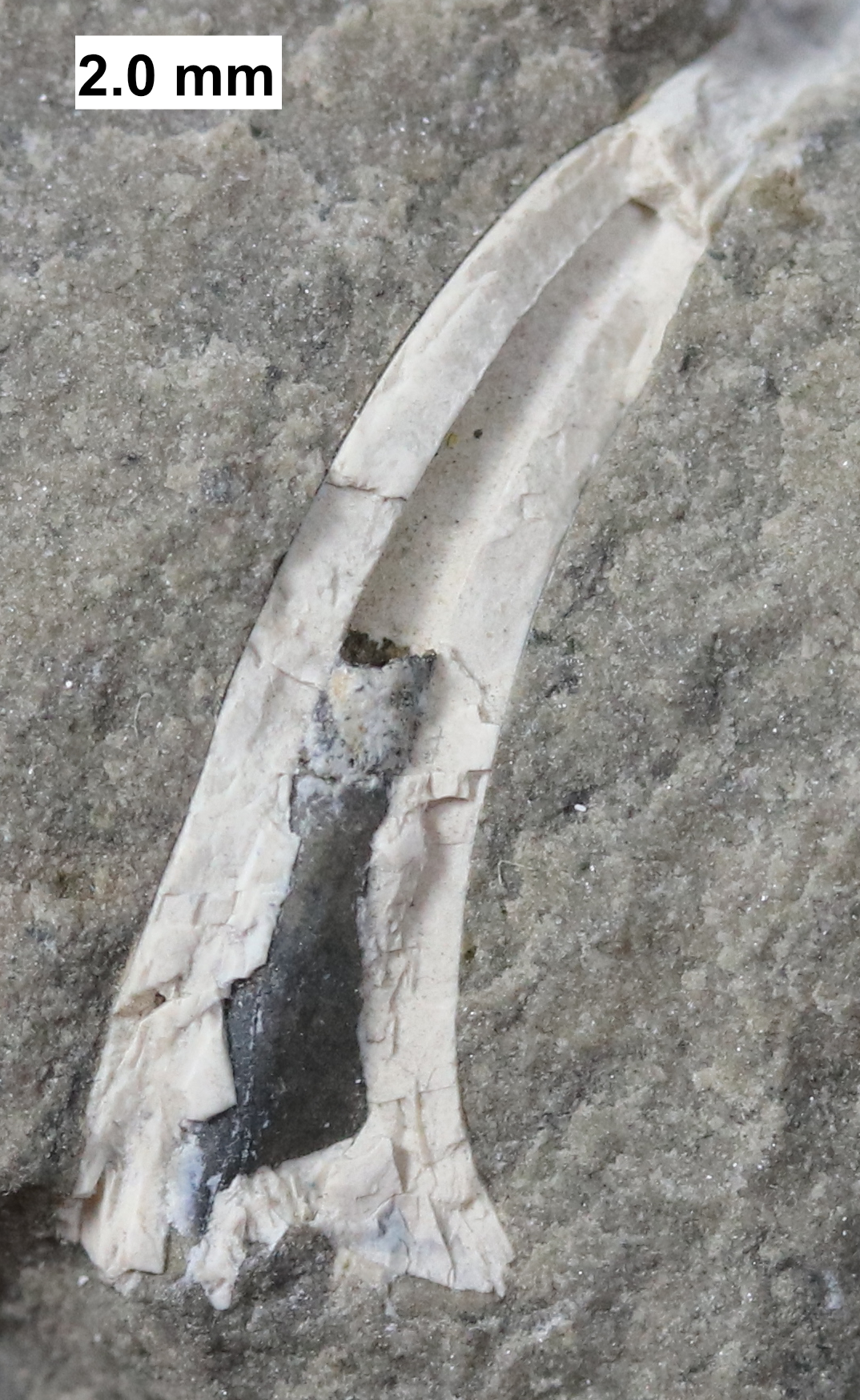
Tooth of the lobe-finned fish Onychodus from the Middle Devonian of Wisconsin

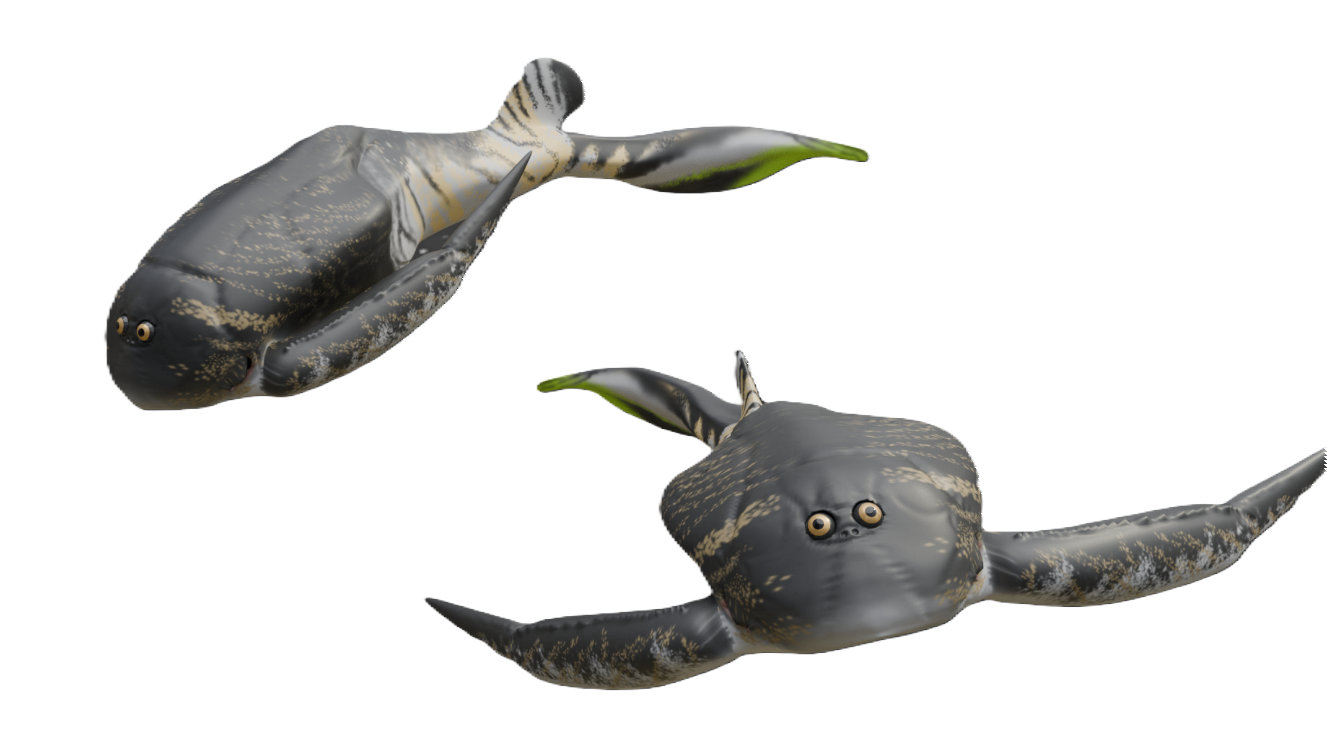
Bothriolepis, a diverse antiarch genus that lived from the Mid to Late Devonian.

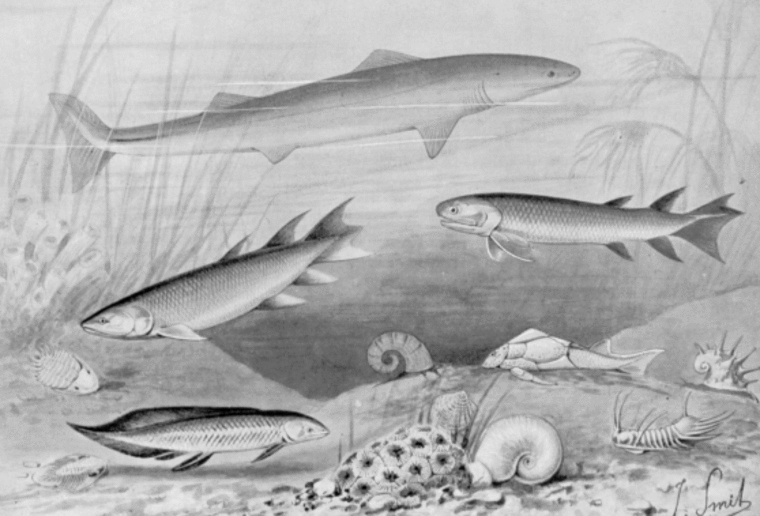
Shark-like Cladoselache, several lobe-finned fishes, including Eusthenopteron that was an early marine tetrapodomorph, and the placoderm Bothriolepis in a painting from 1905

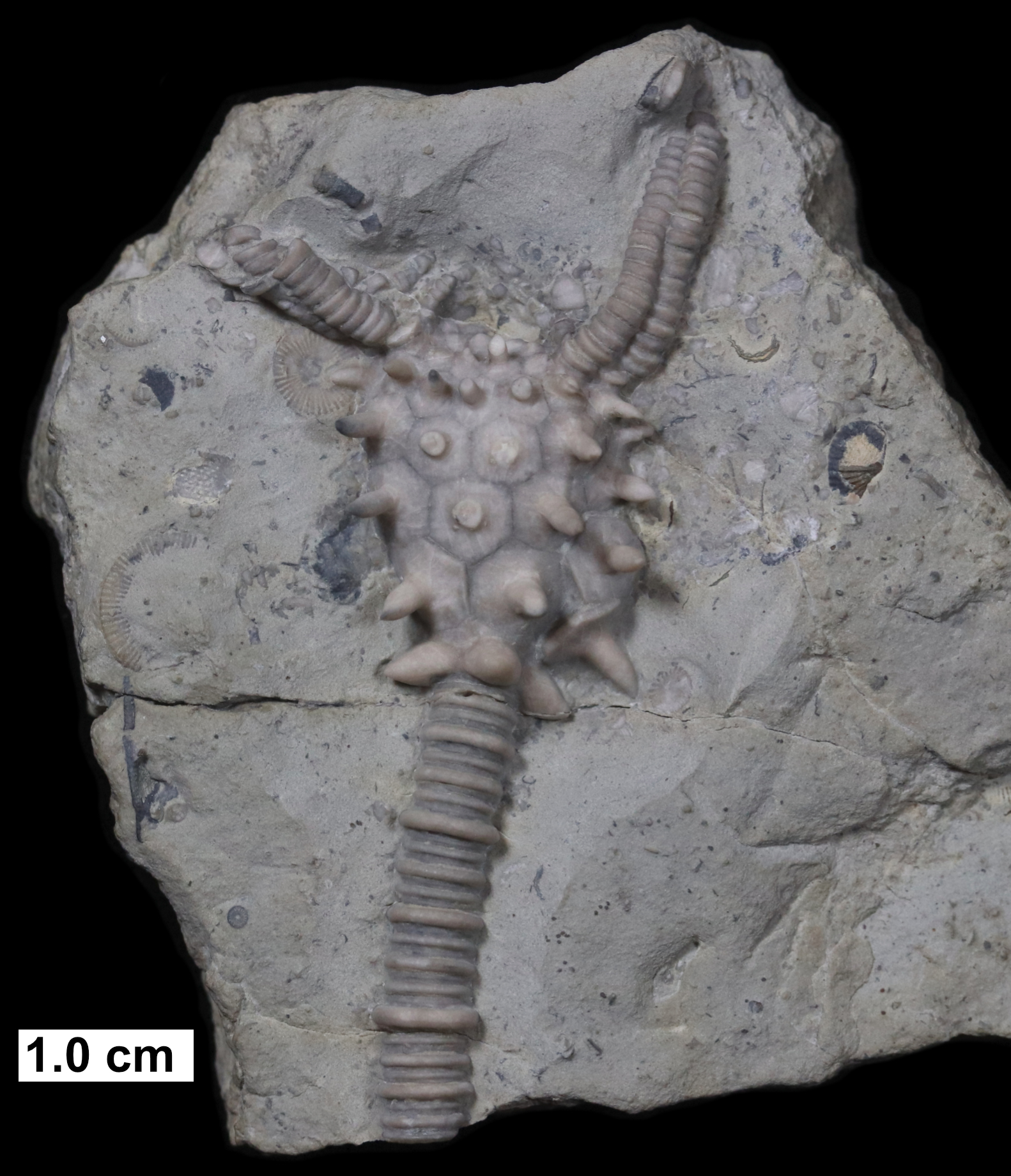
Melocrinites nodosus spinosus, a spiny, stalked crinoid from the Middle Devonian of Wisconsin

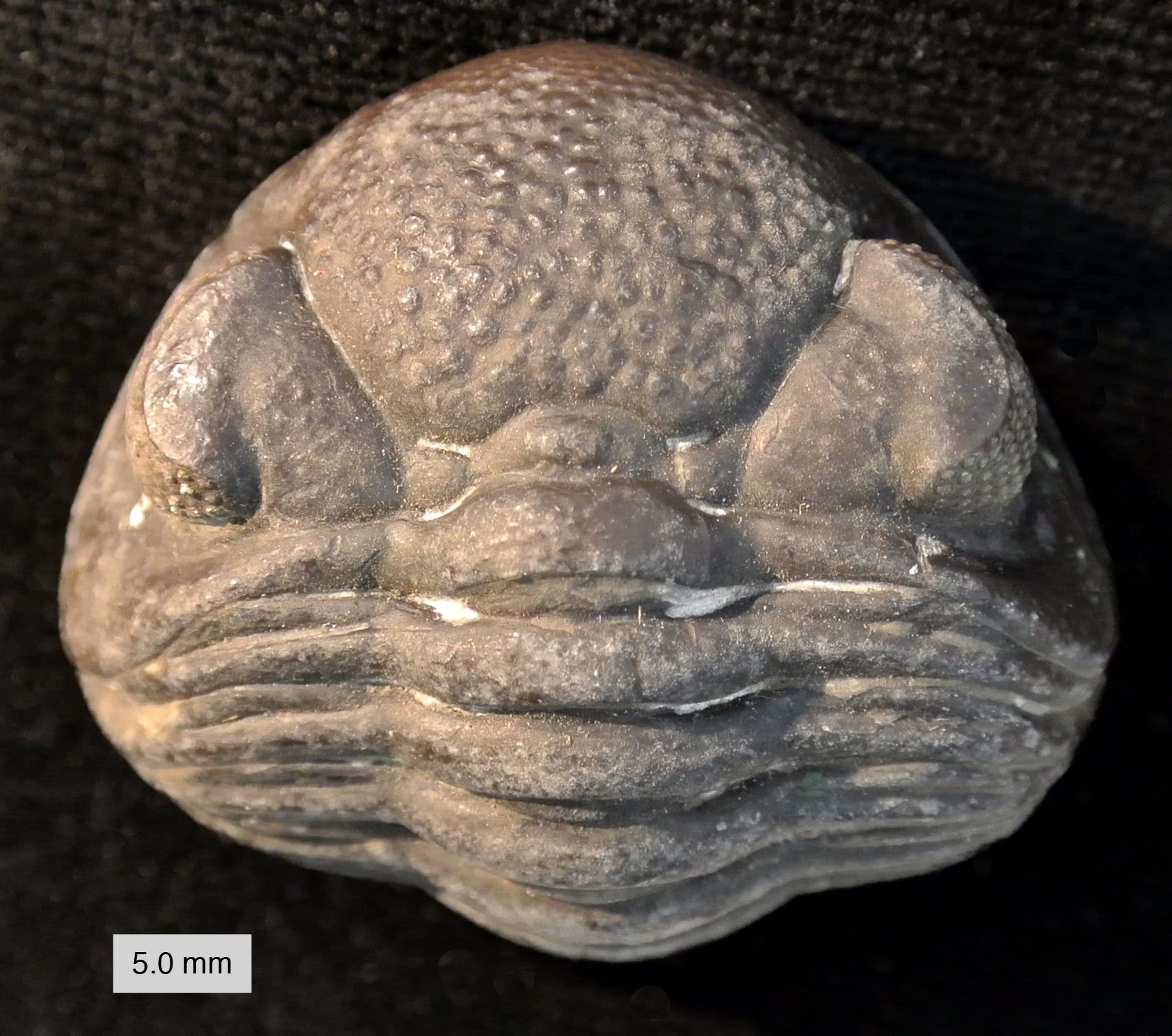
Enrolled phacopid trilobite from the Devonian of Ohio

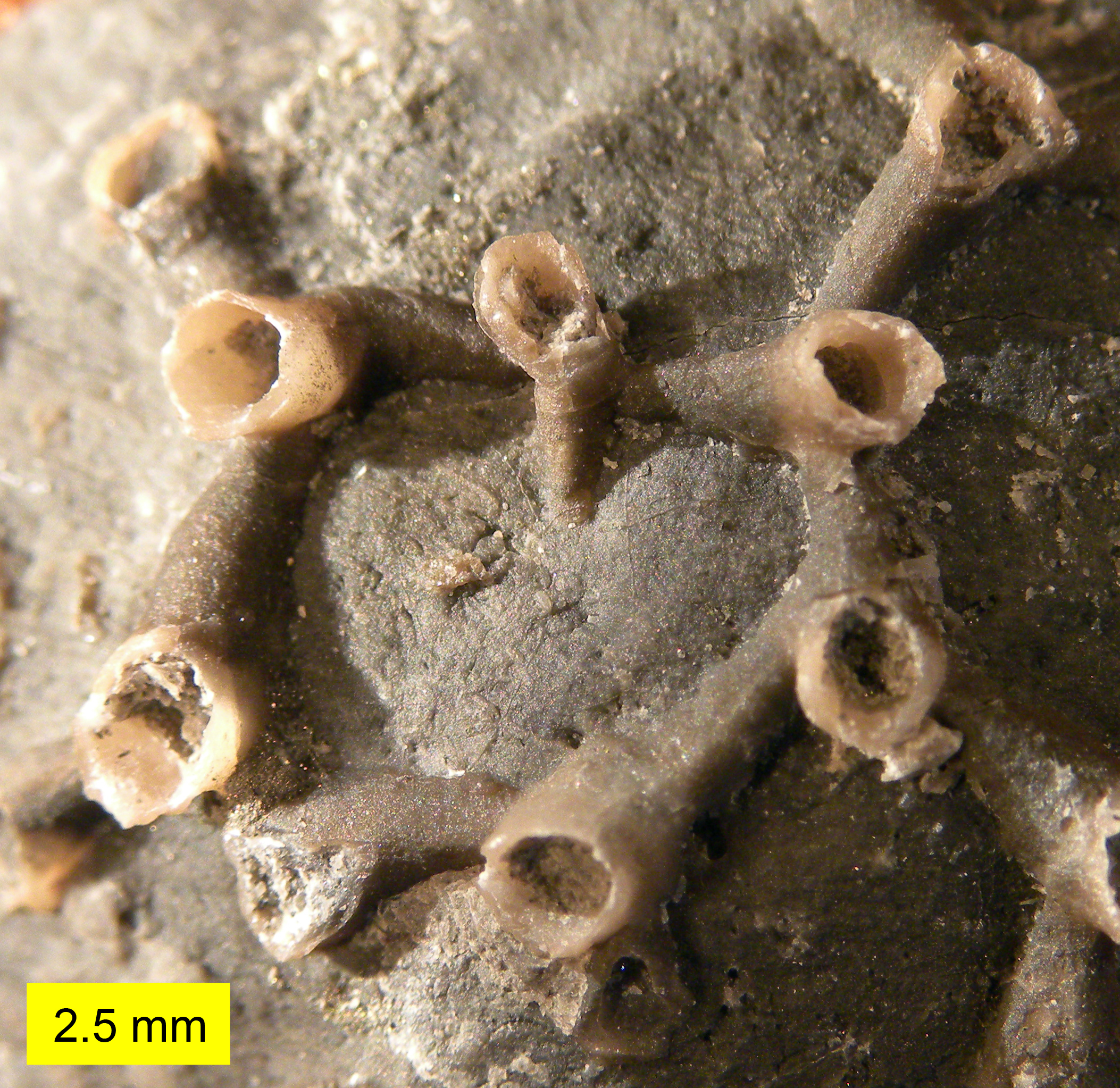
The common tabulate coral Aulopora from the Middle Devonian of Ohio – view of colony encrusting a brachiopod valve

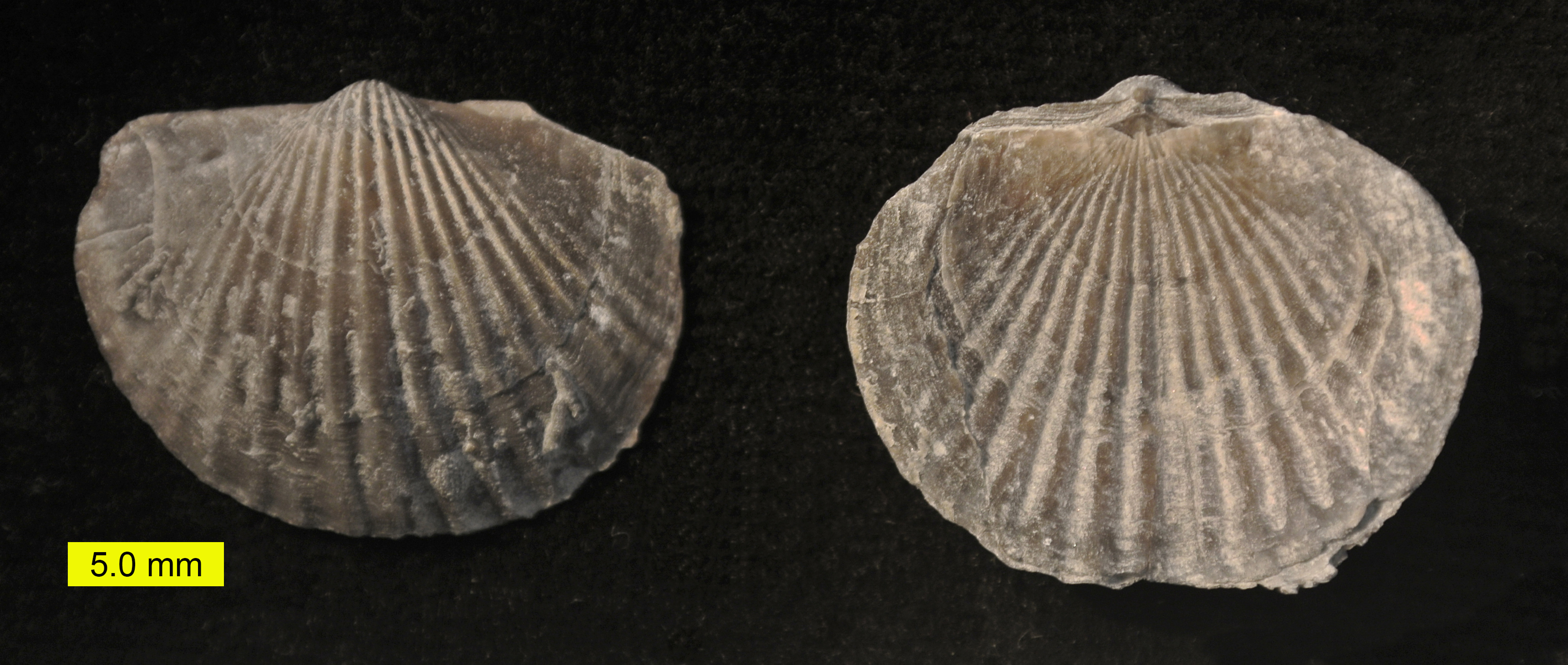
Tropidoleptus carinatus, an orthid brachiopod from the Middle Devonian of New York

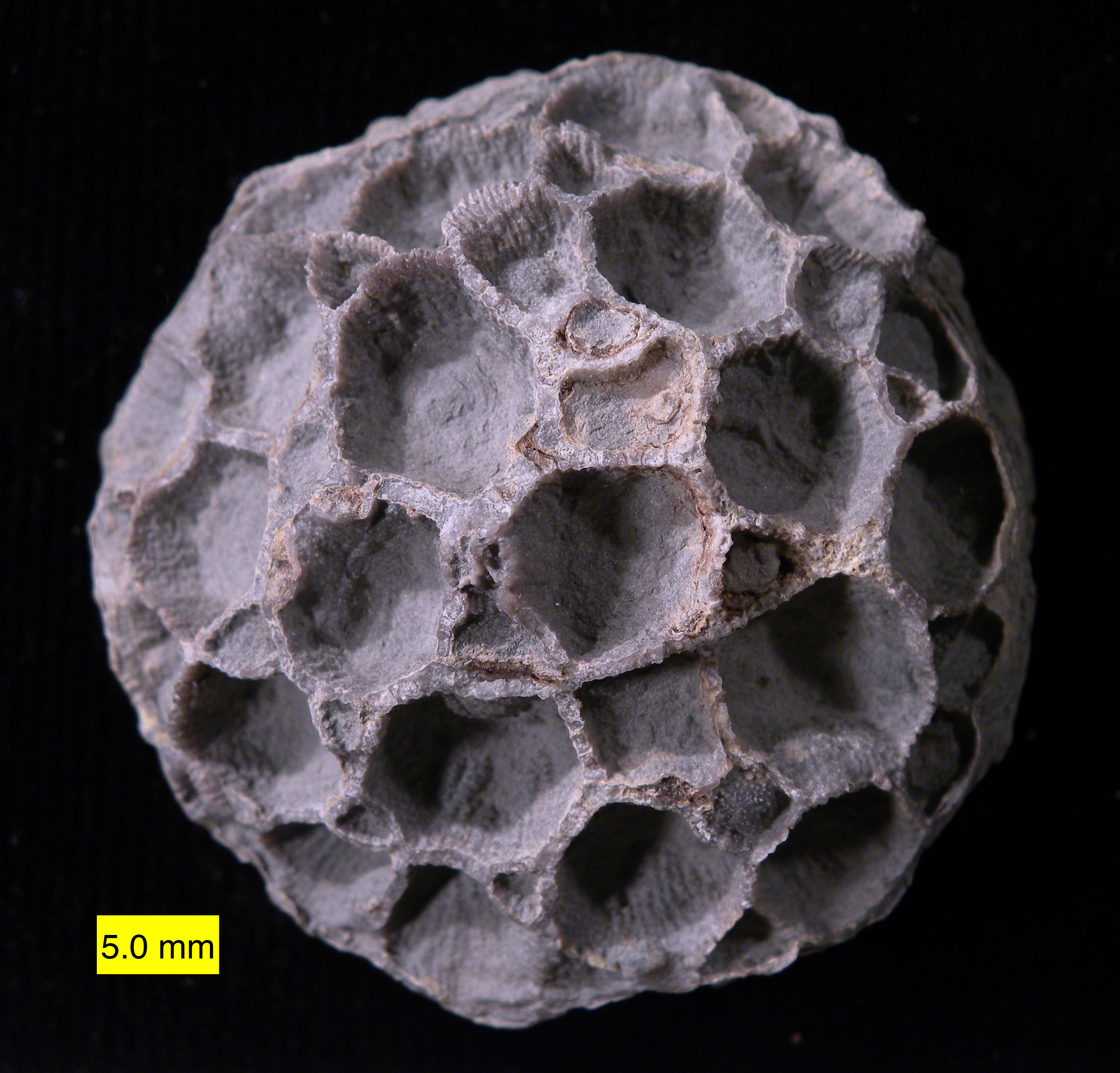
Pleurodictyum americanum, a unique Tabulate coral, Kashong Shale, Middle Devonian of New York

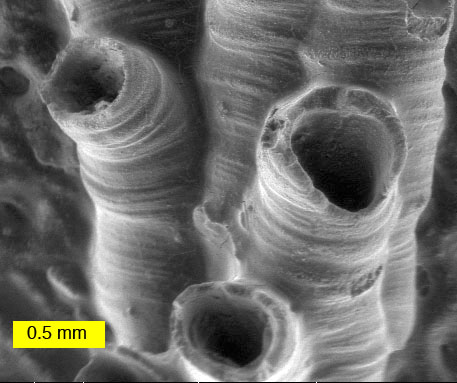
SEM image of a hederelloid from the Devonian of Michigan (largest tube diameter is 0.75 mm)

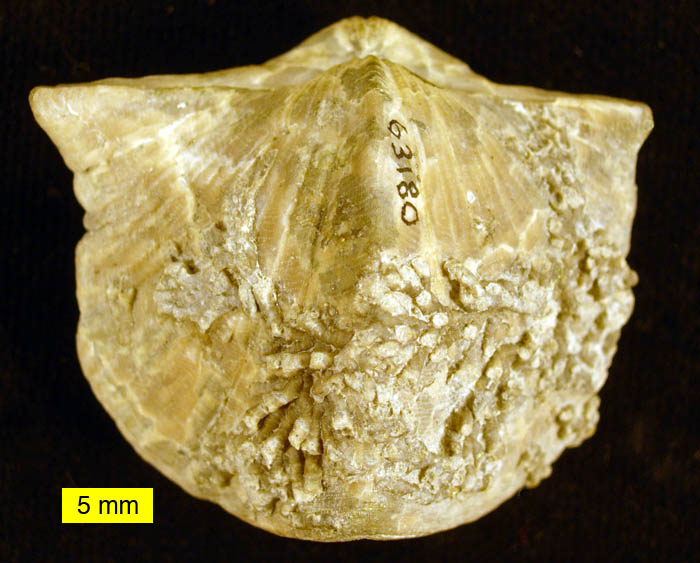
Devonian spiriferid brachiopod from Ohio which served as a host substrate for a colony of hederelloids

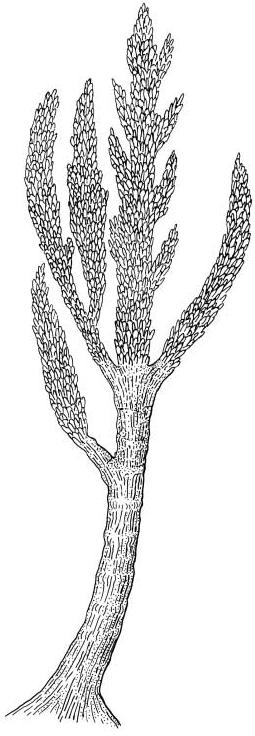
Prototaxites, an 8-meter genus of unknown eukaryotic kingdom (incertae sedis).

== Late Devonian extinction ==
The Late Devonian is characterised by three episodes of extinction ("Late D")

The Late Devonian extinction is not a single event, but rather is a series of pulsed extinctions at the Givetian-Frasnian boundary, the Frasnian-Famennian boundary, and the Devonian-Carboniferous boundary. Together, these are considered one of the "Big Five" mass extinctions in Earth's history. The Devonian extinction crisis primarily affected the marine community, and selectively affected shallow warm-water organisms rather than cool-water organisms. The most important group to be affected by this extinction event were the reef-builders of the great Devonian reef systems.

Amongst the severely affected marine groups were the brachiopods, trilobites, ammonites, and acritarchs, and the world saw the disappearance of an estimated 96% of vertebrates like conodonts and bony fishes, and all of the ostracoderms and placoderms. Land plants as well as freshwater species, such as our tetrapod ancestors, were relatively unaffected by the Late Devonian extinction event (there is a counterargument that the Devonian extinctions nearly wiped out the tetrapods).

The reasons for the Late Devonian extinctions are still unknown, and all explanations remain speculative. Canadian paleontologist Digby McLaren suggested in 1969 that the Devonian extinction events were caused by an asteroid impact. However, while there were Late Devonian collision events (see the Alamo bolide impact), little evidence supports the existence of a large enough Devonian crater.

== See also ==
- Falls of the Ohio State Park – State park in Indiana, United States. One of the largest exposed Devonian fossil beds in the world.
- Geologic time scale – System that relates geologic strata to time
- List of Early Devonian land plants
- List of fossil sites (with link directory)
- Phacops rana – Extinct species of trilobite, a Devonian trilobite

Categories

- Category:Devonian plants
