= Huincul Fault =

Fault that extends from the Neuquén Basin eastwards into the Argentine Shelf

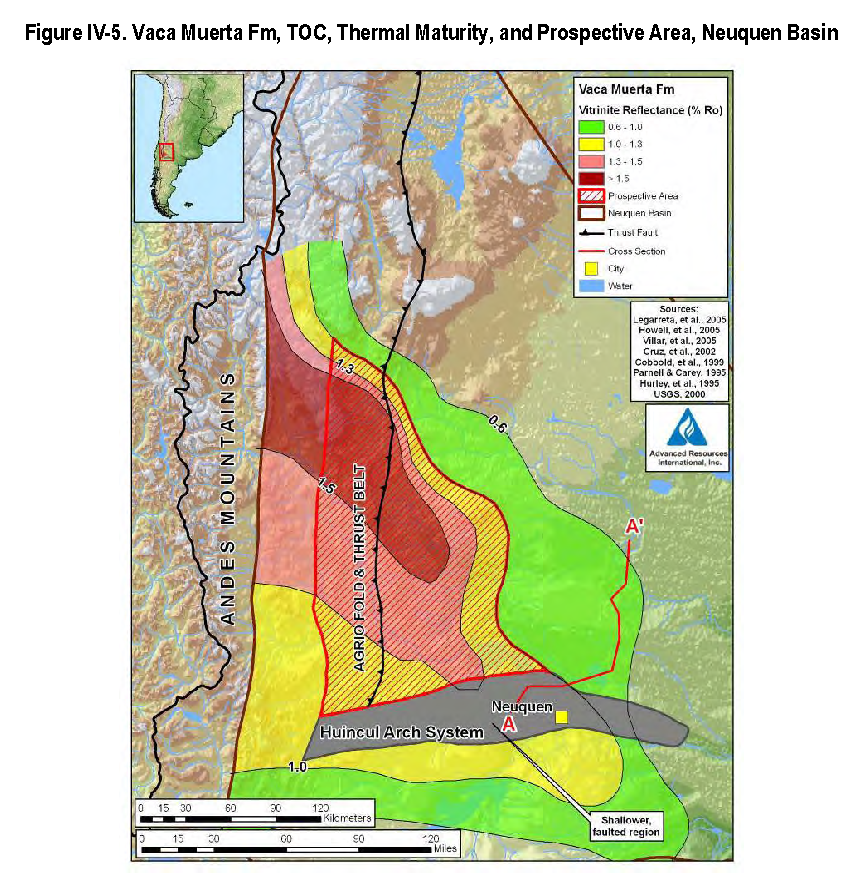
Map of Vaca Muerta Formation in Neuquén Basin. The formations extent mimics that of the basin. Colors indicate hydrocarbon maturity as measured by vitrinite reflectance. Huincul basement high is shown in grey.

The Huincul Fault or Huincul Fault Zone (Spanish: Falla de Huincul, Zona de falla Huincul) is an east-to-west-oriented, continental-scale fault that extends from the Neuquén Basin eastwards into the Argentine Shelf, passing near the cities of Plaza Huincul and Cutral Có, in central Neuquén Province (approximately 38.65°S 69.20°W). To the west, it has been proposed that the fault extends across the Andes to the Chilean Coast Range.

In the Neuquén Basin, the fault exhibits a slightly curved path, being convex to the north. It is a major geological discontinuity and it truncates the north-to-south-oriented Pampean orogen, among other structures. Because of this, it has been proposed to represent the northern geological limit of Patagonia.

== Origin and development ==
The fault develops on the suture zone between the Patagonian terranes and western Gondwana. In a broader sense, the Huincul Fault Zone is a belt of deformation, thus it is the suture zone itself. The first and main deformation phase along the fault zone began in the Toarcian age continued through the Valanginian age before vanishing in Albian times. Strike-slip movement along the fault began in the Toarcian. The main stress vector (i.e. direction of compression) was originally northwest-oriented but shifted over time to the north-northwest. In the Late Miocene, the last phase of deformation began with east–west compression followed by tectonic extension in Pliocene times.

The different stages of deformation were a consequence of the successive subduction of the Aluk, Farallon, and Nazca plates beneath the plates of Gondwana and then South America.

== Geological structures ==
A structure associated with the fault, the Huincul basement high or Huincul Ridge (Spanish: Dorsal de Huincul) divides the Neuquén Basin in two parts. The basement high is one of the most studied features of the Neuquén Basin, given its importance for hydrocarbon exploration and production. The basement high has an approximate length of 250 to 300 km (160 to 190 mi). Various ideas have been expressed concerning the nature of this structure. In the 1970s and 1980s, it was proposed to be a transpressive fault zone. Later, Pángaro et al.. described it as being made up of inverted half-grabens. East of city of Neuquén, the fault roughly follows the path of the upper course of Río Negro. In this region, a series of basement highs and small pull-apart basins has formed along the fault, reflecting a clockwise movement.
