= Basement high =

Portion of the basement in a sedimentary basin that is higher than its surroundings

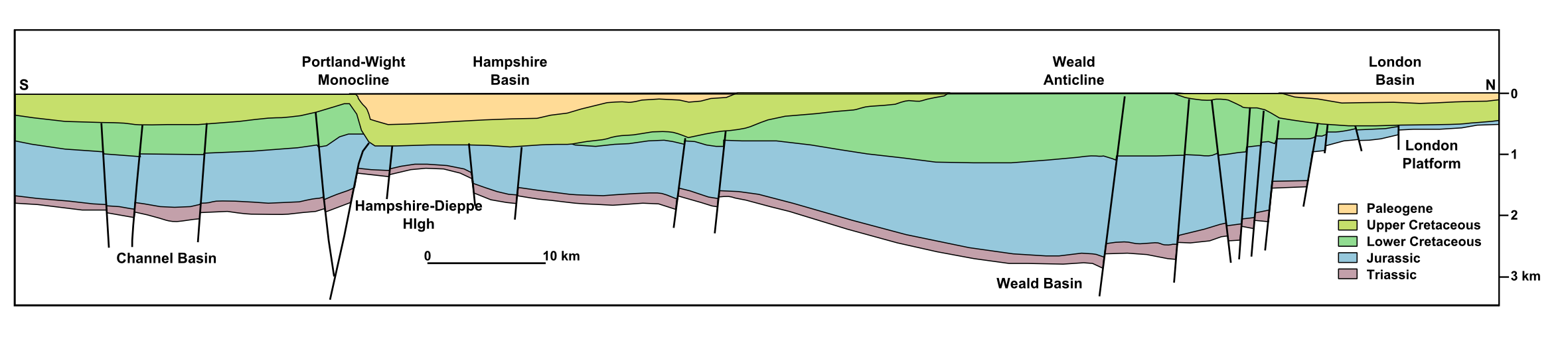
Cross section of the Weald in England. A basement high (the Hampshire-Dieppe High) can be seen in the centre-left.

In geology, a basement high is a portion of the basement in a sedimentary basin that is higher than its surroundings. Commonly, basement highs are hidden by the sedimentary fill of the basin. Usually basement highs are elongated features of tectonic origin.
