= Backstop (geology) =

Geology term

In geology, a backstop is the region of forearcs that has much higher shear strength and yield strength than other overriding material closer to the oceanic trench. The area between the backstop and the trench deforms more than the area from the backstop away from the trench, resulting in different degrees of accumulated deformation. In other words, it can be said that the backstop is relatively resistant to deviatoric stresses induced by subduction.
