= Gastre Fault =

Geological fault system in Argentina

The Gastre Fault Zone (GFZ) is a NW-SE striking dextral Jurassic Gastre Fault System (cf. Rapela & Pankhurst, 1992) in Central Patagonia, Argentina.

From a tentative correlation of the fault zone with the similarly NW-SE trend, it was termed ‘Gastre Fault Zone’ or ‘Gastre-Purén Fault Zone’ to the Lanalhue Fault Zone in Chile by early works. However, in later works it is shown that this correlation is incorrect. Since the lake ‘Lago Lanalhue’, is located on the fault trace and shows a NW-SE-elongated shape, ‘Lanalhue Fault Zone (LFZ)’ stands as appropriate name for the here discussed fault zone. The Mocha-Villarrica Fault Zone is the NW-SE trending fault responsible for the alignment of Villarrica, Quetrupillán and Lanín volcanoes.
