= Fénix capsules =

Emergency mine evacuation chambers

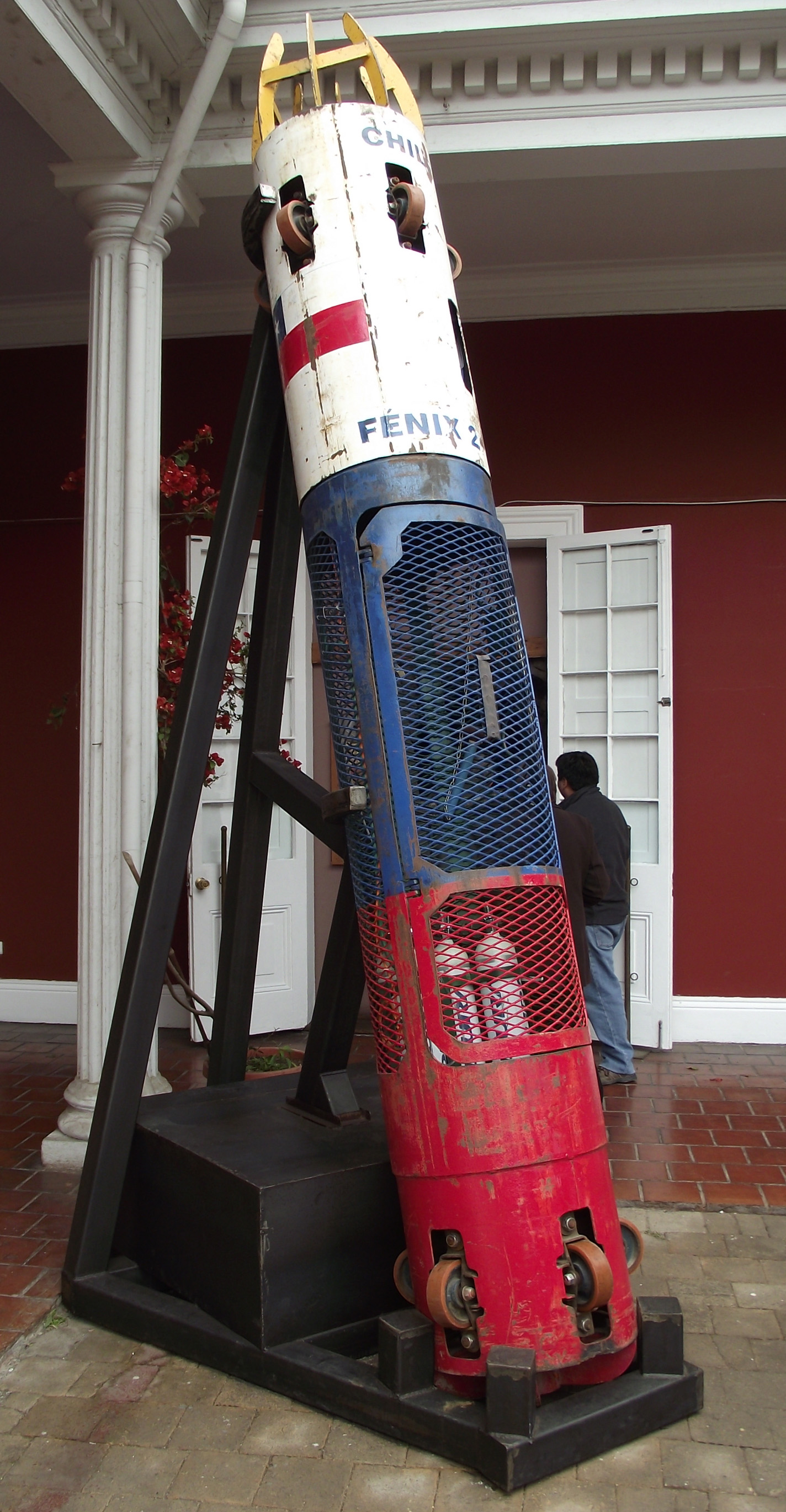
Fénix 2 capsule on display at the Atacama Regional Museum in Copiapó.

The Fénix capsules were three metallic containers that were used for the rescue of 33 trapped miners after the 2010 Copiapó mining accident, and are an enhanced version of the Dahlbusch Bomb. The capsules were constructed by Astilleros y Maestranzas de la Armada (ASMAR), (Navy Shipyards and Armories), who named it Fénix (Phoenix).

== Description ==
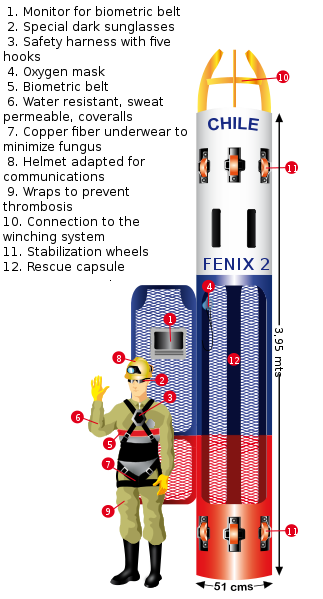
Diagram of the rescue capsule "Fenix" class and the miner equipment used in the Copiapó accident of 2010 rescue.

The Fénix capsules were designed by the Chilean Navy, in collaboration with the United States space agency NASA. They have a diameter of 54 centimetres (21 in), and have eight wheels located on the top and the bottom, with a damping system for mobility in the pipeline. The Fénix capsules have a harness to hold the occupant, an oxygen supply, and a microphone with speakers, which were used to connect the miners with the rescuers at the surface during the rescue.

Officially, three prototypes of the capsule were created. The Fénix 1 had a larger diameter than the other two capsules and was used in tests in the shaft created by the Schramm Inc. T-130 drill, where it descended to a depth of 610 metres (2,000 ft). Fénix 2 was operated with an Austrian pulley system and was used throughout the rescue of the miners. Fénix 3 was held in reserve and not used. The Commander-in-Chief of the Chilean Navy, Admiral Edmundo González Robles said that ASMAR had also constructed a fourth capsule, that was not taken to Copiapó, and that the Fénix capsules were going to be patented.

Several major online news media organizations produced illustrations of the basic Fénix design.

== Capsule after the rescue ==
After the rescue, possession of the Fenix 2 was the subject of a dispute between the Government of Chile, ASMAR and the Municipality of Copiapó. The Government announced a tour of the capsule all over the country, starting with its exhibition in the Plaza de la Constitución in Santiago, the capital of Chile.

Fénix 1 was exhibited at Expo Shanghai 2010. One of the capsules was displayed at the National Museum of Natural History in Washington, D.C. for a special exhibition titled "Against All Odds: Rescue at the Chilean Mine", which began on August 5, 2011.

Auction experts estimate that the Fénix 2 could be worth up to US$1 million. The senior valuer for auctioneers Dominic Winter in Gloucestershire, England said "The capsule is a 21st-century icon and symbolizes many things including the triumph of hope and the human spirit over adversity, teamwork and technology over nature and the myriad of uplifting stories of the 33 miners and their families. The capsule will be recognized by the whole world for decades to come and would be a major tourist attraction for any science or popular culture museum, which is its most logical home." The Fénix 2 capsule went on display at the Atacama Regional Museum in Copiapó from August 3, 2011. On February 11, 2012, the capsule was put on display at the Science Museum, London, to be displayed until May 13.

A replica of the Fénix 2 was given to the city of Canberra by the government of Chile in 2011 and erected opposite the Australian National University's student offices.

Images related to the Fénix class rescue capsule

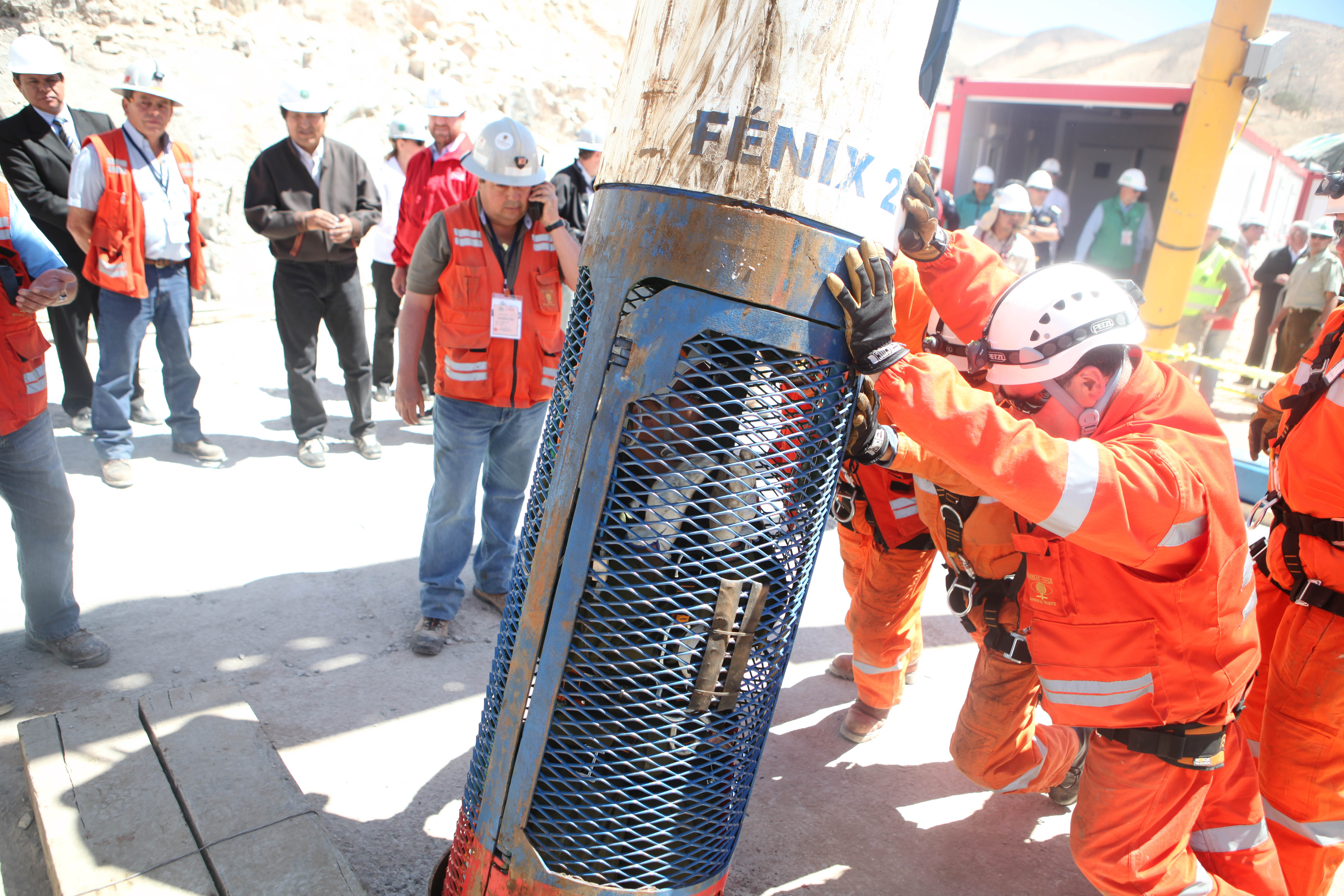
The fifth rescuer, Patricio Sepúlveda, is in the rescue capsule and is being lowered into the San José Mine, during "Operación San Lorenzo".

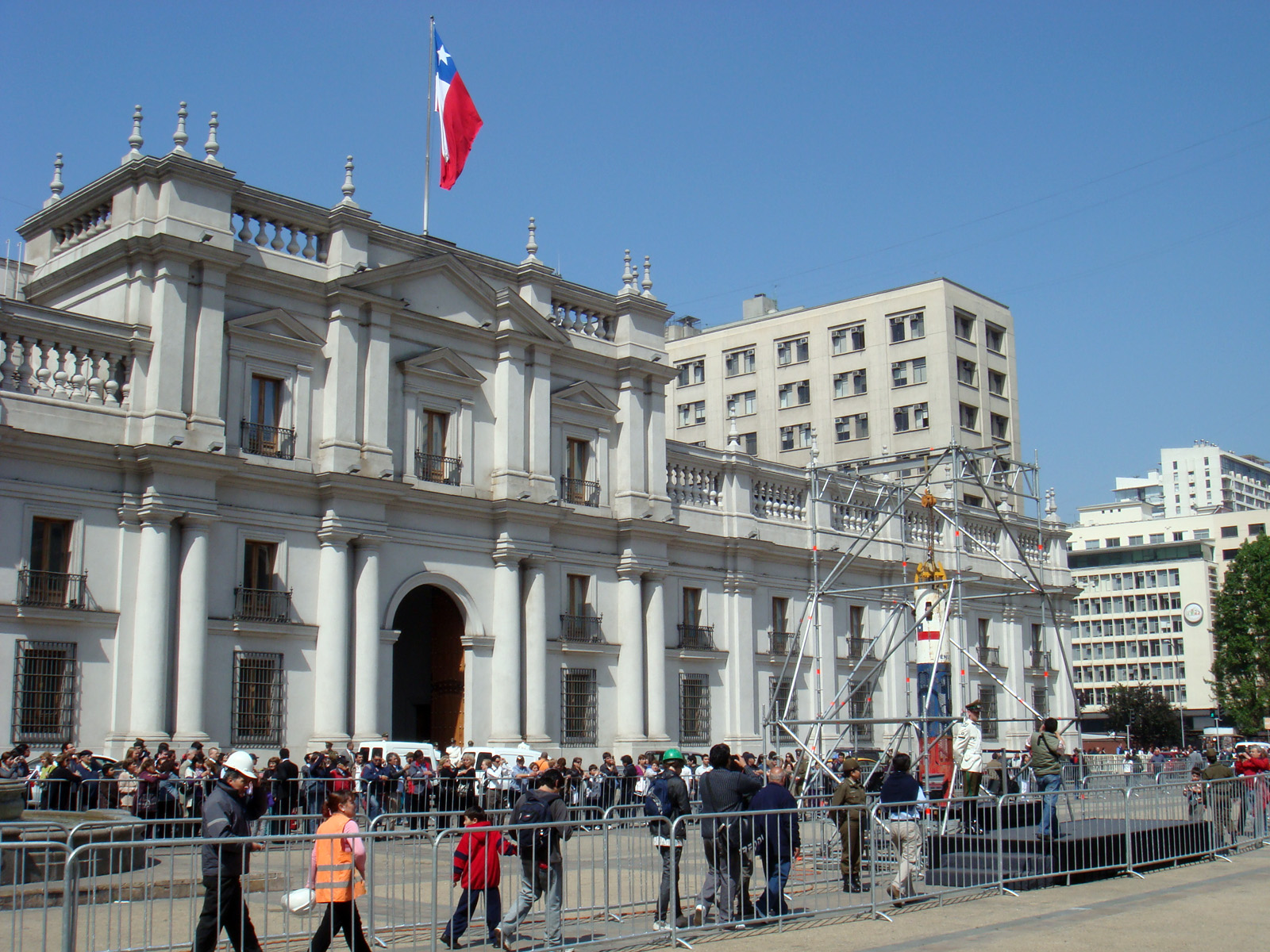
Fénix-2 capsule on display in front of La Moneda presidential palace in Santiago

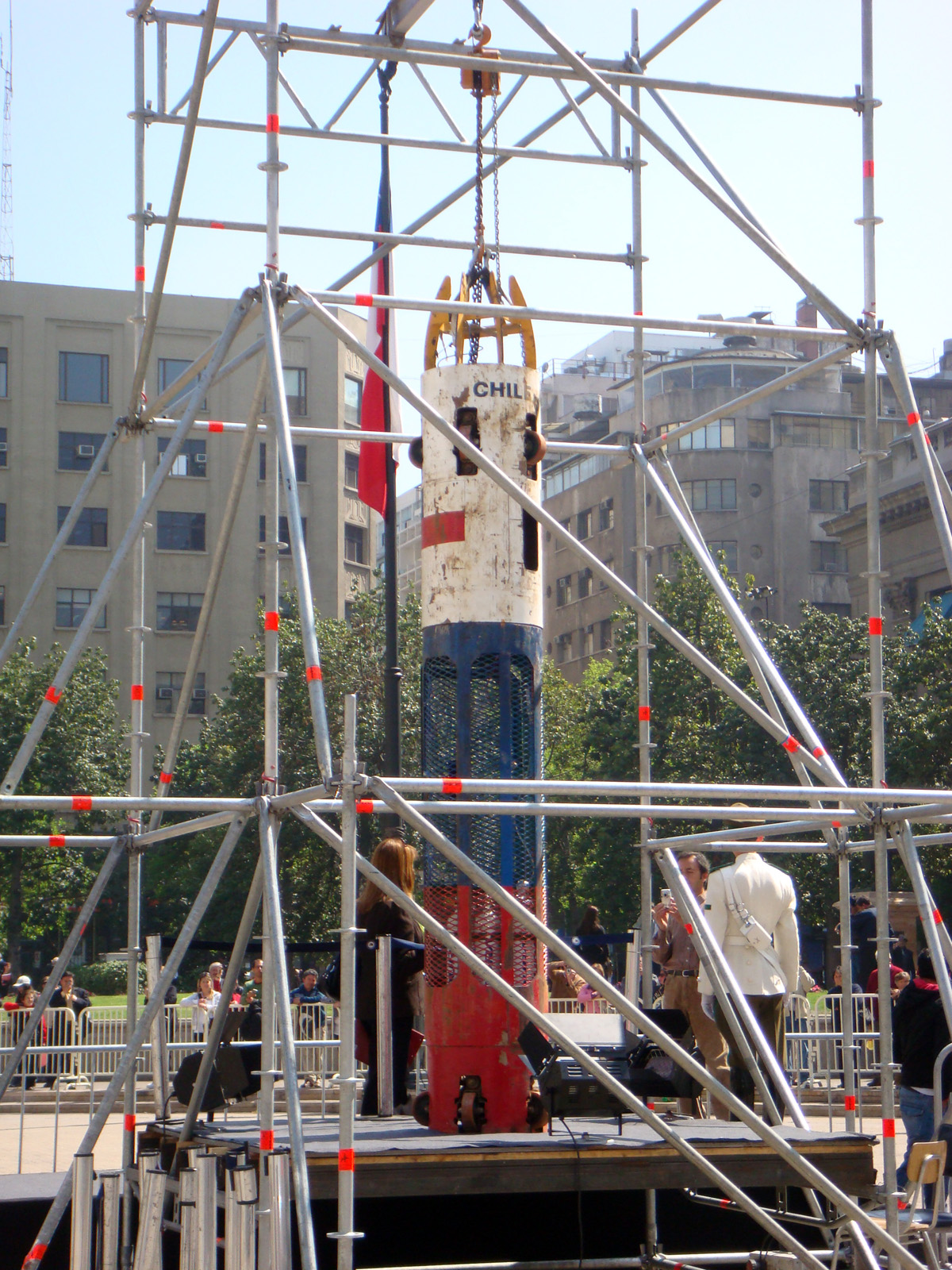
Fénix-2 capsule on display in Santiago in October 2010

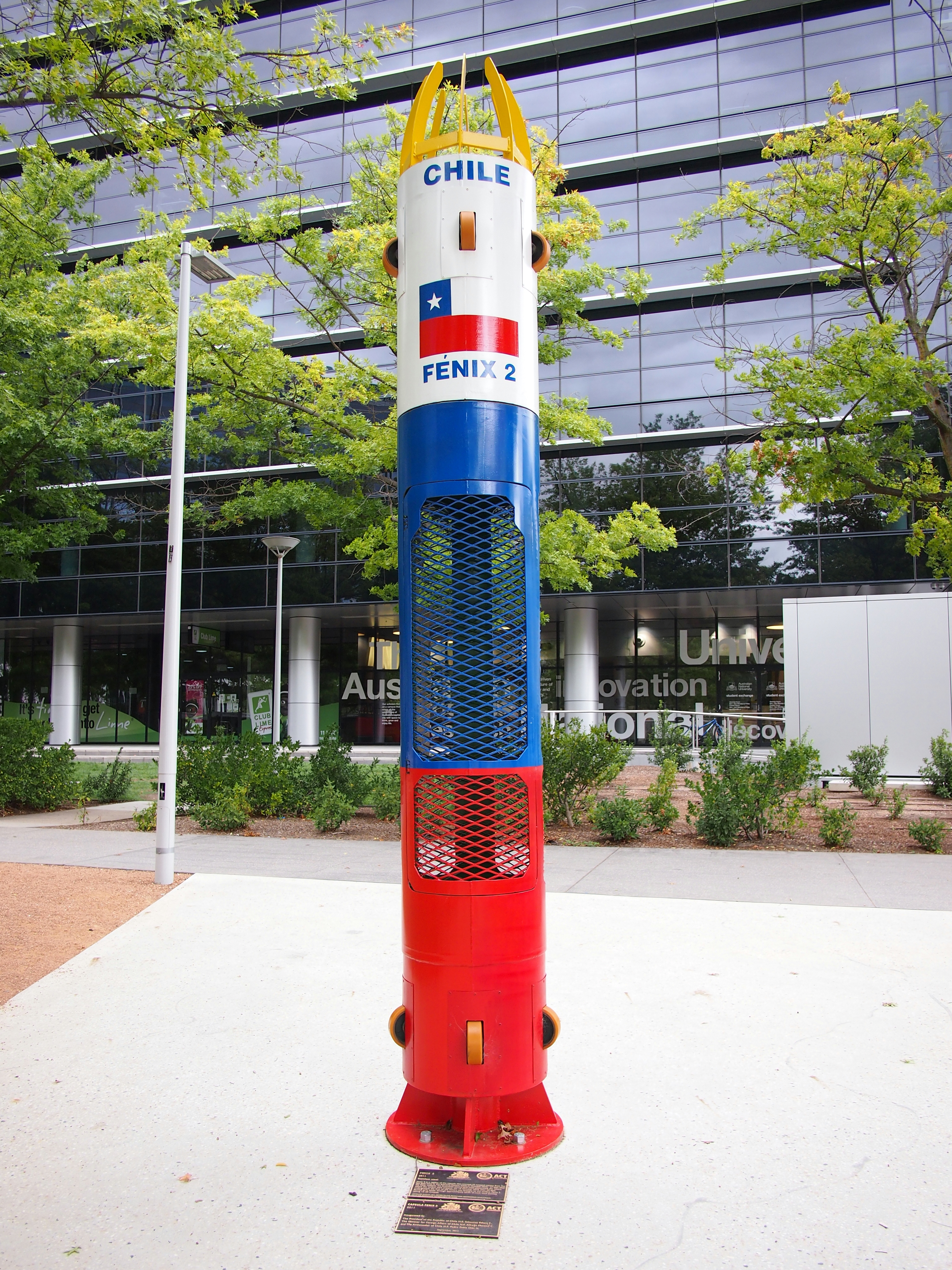
Replica of the Fénix 2 capsule in Canberra

== See also ==
- Quecreek Mine Rescue involved a similar rescue capsule in Pennsylvania, July 2002 to rescue a trapped mining crew.
