= CMSE =

CMSE may refer to:

- China Manned Space Engineering, the space agency in charge of China's human spaceflight program
- Chris Mee Safety Engineering, an Irish health and safety company
- Compañía Minera San Esteban Primera, a Chilean mining company
- Southeastern Military Command (Comando Militar do Sudeste), a Brazilian Army military command
- The Center for Mathematics and Science Education, part of the Texas A&M University College of Science
- Clinique et Maternité Saint-Élisabeth de Namur, a department of the CHU UCLouvain Namur
