= Wynnefield Capital =

Wynnefield Capital, Inc.
- Industry: Hedge funds
- Founded: 1992
- Founder: Nelson Obus, Joshua Landes
- Headquarters: New York, NY
- Website: wynnecap.com

Wynnefield Capital, Inc., is an employee-owned hedge fund founded in 1992 by Nelson Obus and Joshua Landes. The fund is a value investor, specializing in U.S. small-cap companies with a business- or industry-specific catalyst. It employs long and short strategies and conducts in-house research in making its investments. The fund has been an activist investor with a number of companies, including Cornell Companies, Crown Crafts, Breeze-Eastern, MAM Software, Chiquita Brands, and Omega Protein.

Wynnefield Capital is based in New York City and is named after Nelson Obus’ and Landes’ childhood neighborhood of Wynnefield in Philadelphia, Pennsylvania.

In May 2014, after a 12-year battle, Nelson Obus and a Wynnefield analyst were exonerated of all insider trading accusations made by the SEC in a trial by jury. Nelson Obus has been an outspoken critic of the SEC and penned an op-ed on regulatory overreach for The Wall Street Journal.

== Founders: Nelson Obus and Joshua Landes ==
Prior to founding Wynnefield, Nelson Obus and Joshua Landes both held senior research equity positions at Lazard Feres & Co. Nelson Obus currently serves on the board of directors for Zionist Organization of America, Layne Christensen Co., MK Acquisition LLC, and the Princeton Historical Society. Obus also serves on the board of advisors of the Bank of Princeton, the Appalachian Mountain Club, and the Stony Brook-Millstone Watershed Association. He previously served on the Boards of Directors of Breeze-Eastern Corporation and Underground Solutions, Inc.

Landes is a member of the Board of Trustees of S.A.R. Academy in Riverdale, New York; Board of Directors of Ken's Krew and the Zionist Organization of America, and the Vice President of the American Jewish Historical Society. Landes led the financing efforts for the creation of a statue commemorating Uriah P. Levy, the first Jewish admiral to serve in the U.S. Navy.
