= BZC =

BZC, Bžć, or bzc could refer to:

- Berkeley Zen Center, a Buddhist religious center in Berkeley, California, U.S.
- BZC Brandenburg, a Dutch swimming club in Bilthoven, the Netherlands
- Southern Betsimisaraka, a dialect of Malagasy (the national language of Madagascar), by ISO 639-3 code
- Umberto Modiano Airport, an airport near Armação dos Búzios, Brazil, by IATA code
- Breeze-Eastern, an American manufacturing company, by stock ticker
- Balićžunićite, a mineral; see List of mineral symbols
- Beliatore railway station, a train station in Beliatore, West Bengal, India
