= Mario Sepúlveda =

Mario Sepúlveda may refer to:

- Mario Sepúlveda Palma (born 1972), Chilean mountain climber and ski mountaineer
- Mario Sepúlveda (born 1970), Chilean miner capitain who held the miners together and members of the trapped group in the 2010 Copiapó mining accident
