= Nelson Obus =

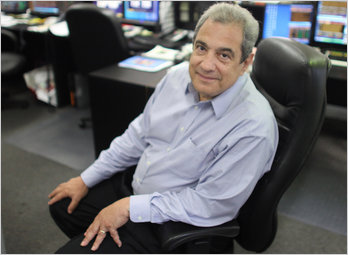
- Born: 1947 (age 78–79); Philadelphia, Pennsylvania
- Education: New York University (B.A.); Brandeis University (M.A.)
- Occupations: Co-founder, President, and Chief Investment Officer of Wynnefield Capital, Inc.
- Website: WynnefieldCapital.com nelsonobus.com/

Nelson Obus is an American businessman, hedge fund manager and out-spoken critic of the SEC. He is the co-founder, president and Chief Investment Officer of Wynnefield Capital, Inc., an employee-owned hedge fund, specializing in value stocks of small-cap companies.

== Early life and career ==
Obus, the son of a retail stockbroker, was born in 1947 and grew up in Wynnefield, a neighborhood of Philadelphia. He received a B.A. from New York University and an M.A. in Political Science from Brandeis University. After college he turned down a job on Wall Street and taught natural history for the Massachusetts Audubon Society and was Director of Interpretive Services for the Massachusetts Department of Environmental Management beginning in 1977. In 1981 he began working as an Analyst at the investment bank Lazard Freres & Co. with future Wynnefield Capital partner Joshua Landes. At the time of his departure in 1992 he was Director of Sell Side Research in the Equity Sales Department.

== Wynnefield Capital, Inc. ==
In 1992 Obus and Landes founded Wynnefield Capital, Inc., a New-York-based hedge fund focused on US public equity markets and exchange traded funds. The fund is a value investor, specializing in U.S. small-cap companies with a business- or industry-specific catalyst. Wynnefield has been an activist investor and Obus has been elected to the board of a number of companies. He currently serves on the board of directors for Layne Christensen Co. and MK Acquisition LLC. He previously served on the Boards of Breeze-Eastern Corporation and Underground Solutions, Inc.

Obus also serves on the board of directors for Zionist Organization of America and the Princeton Historical Society, as well the board of advisors of the Bank of Princeton, the Appalachian Mountain Club, and the Stony Brook-Millstone Watershed Association.

== 12-Year SEC Battle ==
In May 2014, after a 12-year battle, Obus and a Wynnefield analyst were exonerated of insider trading accusations made by the SEC in a trial by jury. Since the trial Obus has been an outspoken critic of the SEC and an advocate for policy change. He penned an op-ed on regulatory overreach for The Wall Street Journal, questioning SEC accountability and the cost of long investigations and wrongful settlements to the U.S. economy. Obus has also fought for access to government records of his case in accordance with the Freedom of Information Act. As of August 2015, the SEC has only released 83 of the 2,000 documents.
