= San José Mine =

Copper-gold mine in Atacama Region, Chile

Mina San José
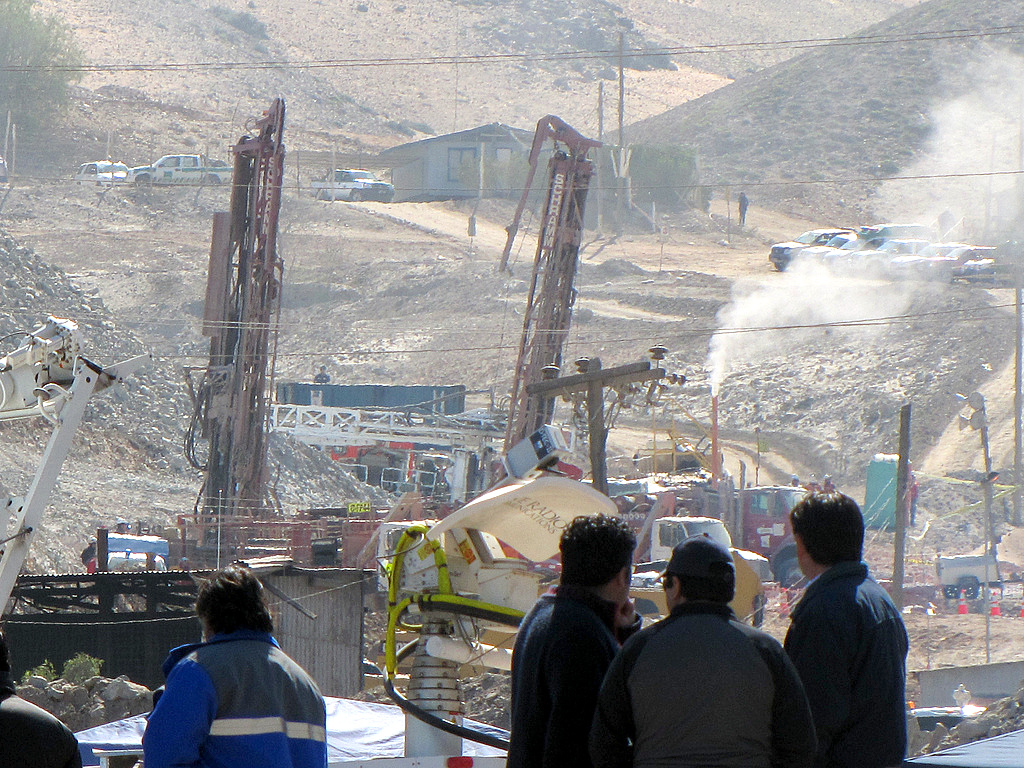
- San José de Copiapó mine during the 2010 mining accident rescue efforts, on August 10.

- Location in Chile Mina San José (Chile)
- Location: Copiapó, Atacama Region, Chile; 27°09′31″S 70°29′52″W
- Products: Copper, Gold
- Opened: 1889
- Closed: 2010
- Company: San Esteban Mining Company

The San José Mine (Spanish: Mina San José) was a small copper-gold mine located near Copiapó, Atacama Region, Chile. The mine became known internationally for its collapse in 2010, which trapped 33 miners 700 metres (2,300 ft) underground. Its workings are reached by a long sloping roadway with many spiral turns (a diagram shows ten turns), not by a vertical mineshaft.

It was converted into a tourist attraction.

== History ==
Diagram of mine layout

The San José Mine is located 45 kilometers northwest of Copiapó. The mine began operations in 1889. In 1957, Jorge Kemeny Letay, a Hungarian immigrant and a nephew of mining businessman Emérico Letay founded the San Esteban Mining Company (Spanish: Compañía Minera San Esteban). Jorge died in 2000 and the administration of the mine was overtaken by his two sons Marcelo and Emérico Kemeny Füller. The latter died in 2004 and Marcelo then associated with his father-in-law Alejandro Bohn Berenguer who became gerente geneal (CEO). Despite the income of the mine not being enough to invest in security measures needed to mine at great depths Bohn is reported to have pushed for continued mining.

According to Terra, the mine's annual sales surpassed 20 million dollars.

Between 2003 and 2010, several mining accidents occurred in the mine, causing at least three deaths. In 2007, a geologist was killed in the mine, and led to its closure. In May 2008, SERNAGEOMIN – Servicio Nacional de Geología y Minería (National Geology and Mining Service) resumed mining operations at the San José Mine. In July 2010, miner Gino Cortés lost a leg in an accident.

=== 2010 cave-in ===
Compañía Minera San Esteban (English: San Esteban Mining Company) advised national authorities on 5 August 2010 that a collapse had occurred at 14:00 local time, and rescue efforts began the next day. National Emergencies Office of Chile reported that day a list of 33 trapped and possibly deceased miners, that included Franklin Lobos, a retired footballer, and Carlos Mamani, a Bolivian miner. The miners were found alive 17 days later, on August 22. Nonetheless, it was not until 69 days after the collapse on October 13, 2010, that the first miner, Florencio Ávalos, was rescued.

San Esteban Mining Company is considering bankruptcy after the miners are rescued. San José is the only mine owned by San Esteban. President of Chile Sebastián Piñera said on October 12 that "the mine will remain closed until security measures that guard the life and dignity of the workers are established."
