= Occupli =

'Occupli, is a specialist in environmental, safety and energy consultancy and training services. The company is retained by organisations in Ireland and the UK to ensure compliance, minimise risk and upskill management and staff.

Occupli was founded in 1996 in Cork, Ireland. It has centres in Dublin and Cork and a fire training facility in Cork Harbour.

Occupli and the Canadian Standards Association (CSA) collaborated in early 2009 to allow Occupli to exclusively deliver CSA Greenhouse Gas (GHG) Management Training Programmes in Ireland and the UK.

An investment by private equity firm Erisbeg in 2021 paved the way for a complete rebrand of the group to Occupli in 2023
