= Layne Christensen Company =

American water management, construction, and drilling company

- Type: Public (NASDAQ: LAYN)
- Industry: Drilling
- Predecessor: Layne, Inc. (established 1882)
- Founded: 1998
- Founder: Mahlon E. Layne
- Headquarters: The Woodlands, Texas, United States
- Area served: Western Hemisphere
- Products: Water Treatment Equipment, Filter Media, Cured in place pipe renewal
- Services: HydroGeologic Services, Drilling, Well and Pump Maintenance, Water Treatment, Pipeline Installation, Sewer Rehabilitation, Mineral Exploration, Unconventional Natural Gas Production, Soil Stabilization and Dewatering.
- Number of employees: 4,500
- Divisions: Water Resources, Mineral Exploration, Geoconstruction services and Energy services
- Subsidiaries: 50 Offices worldwide

Layne Christensen Company is a U.S.-based global water management, construction and drilling company. The company has two divisions, which are Water Resources-Mineral Services and Inline.

== Construction ==
Layne Christensen is involved in the construction of underground projects like dams and levees, tunnels, water lines, subways, highways and marine facilities.

== Drilling ==
Layne specialists are able to define the source, depth, magnitude and overall feasibility of water aquifers, and drill high-volume wells suitable for supplying water to government agencies, industrial and agricultural customers. Their mineral exploration teams extract contaminant-free samples that accurately reflect the underlying mineral deposits.

== Divisions ==
=== Mineral Exploration ===
Mineral Exploration Division conducts primarily above ground drilling activities, including all phases of core drilling, reverse circulation, dual tube, hammer and rotary air-blast methods. Layne's service offerings include both exploratory and directional drilling for major gold, copper and other base metal producers.

=== Inline ===
Layne Inline, LLC is the second largest cured-in-place pipe (CIPP) lining company in the United States. Layne began as the first U.S. licensee of the Inline technology in 1991 and since that time has acquired the technology company, Inline Technologies, LLC, and the liner manufacturer, Liner Products, LLC.

== Markets ==
=== Water ===
Layne identifies and develops new water sources, delivers usable water to communities and facilities around the world, recycles water from oil and gas operations, rehabilitates existing pipelines, and safely returns wastewater to the natural environment.

=== Mineral ===
Layne's service offerings include both exploratory and definitional drilling for major gold, copper and other base metal producers. They conduct primarily above ground drilling activities, including all phases of core drilling, reverse circulation, dual tube, hammer and rotary air-blast methods.

== History ==
Layne started in 1882 as a water-well drilling company in South Dakota. Through various acquisitions, proprietary rights ownerships, and expansions, Layne now has over 40 offices and affiliates in the United States, Canada, Mexico, and South America. During its growth, Layne has evolved from a water-well drilling company to global water management, construction and drilling company that provides services to the water, mineral and energy sectors.

== Acquisitions ==
- Reynolds, Inc. on 28 September 2005
- Collector Wells International, Inc. on 13 July 2006
- American Water's Underground Infrastructure Group on 27 November 2006
- Water and Wastewater Treatment Technologies with Soulmates on 6 December 2007; sold to Arista Capital Partners in January 2021
- Tirade Construction Company on 17 January 2008
- Wittman Hydro Planning Associates on 16 May 2008
- Meadows Construction Company on 18 November 2008
- W.L. Hailey & Company, Inc on 3 November 2009
- Intervals Technologies, LLC on 29 July 2010
- Deliberate Sociedad Anonymous (50% interest), parent company to Costa Fortuna on 25 August 2010
- Bencor Corporation of America on 17 November 2010
- Wildcat Civil Services 28 February 2011
- Costa Fortuna Fundación e Constructors Ltd. (acquired the remaining 50% interest) on 19 June 2012

== In the news ==
In 2010, Layne Christensen assisted in the rescue of 33 miners trapped for 69 days as a result of the Chilean mining accident of 2010 in Chile.

In 2012, it was announced that certain officers and directors at Layne Christensen Company were under investigation in connection with allegations that certain payments by the company to customs clearing agents in connection with importing equipment into the Democratic Republic of Congo potentially might have violated the U.S. Foreign Corrupt Practices Act. Layne voluntarily alerted the U.S. Securities and Exchange Commission and U.S. Department of Justice of the possible discrepancies. Necessary disciplinary actions were taken toward involved parties.

On Thursday, August 30, 2012, the CEO of Layne Christensen Co., Rene Robichaud rang the opening bell at the Nasdaq Stock Market in honor of the company's 130 anniversary.

== Chilean miner rescue ==
On August 5, 2010, a cave-in traps 33 miners underground, and rescue efforts were deployed immediately. Through a joint effort, Layne and their Latin American affiliate, Geotec, the Chilean miners were rescued after 69 days underground.

Large escape boreholes were drilled simultaneously using different equipment provided by multiple international corporations with three different strategies.

1. Plan A, the Strata 950 (702 meter target depth at 90°),
2. Plan B, the Schramm T130XD (638 meter target depth at 82°),
3. Plan C, a RIG-421 drill (597 meter target depth at 85°).

The Layne and Geotech team applied experience from worldwide operations and well over 100 years of drilling experience; Minera Copper and Minera Escondido funded the project and also provided a team of geologists and engineers. On August 15, Geotech uses a Schramm Inc. 685W and two diamond rigs (CS 3001 and CS 4002) for the first drilling stage. Then on August 26, Geotech works to ensure that the 5 1/2-inch 6C pilot hole is drilling to reach the underground workshop. After five days of constant drilling, the third attempt succeeds. As drilling progresses, the T-130XD comes to a halt at 880 feet when the "nose" of the 12-inch hammer bit breaks. It's a setback when the metal piece blocks the well. At this time, Layne drillers flew from Afghanistan and helpers flew from the U.S. arrive. The entire team is now complete and works to clear the hole. Reaming the hole to 12 inches is completed at 2,040 feet, proving the theory of following the 5 1/2-inch hole to the mine workshop and then the hole is reamed to 28 inches to allow for the rescue pod, Phoenix capsules. On October 9, cheers go up as the Plan B drill rig reaches its target - the mine workshop, allowing the rescue to begin. Finally, on October 12, final preparations and test runs are carried out. Rescuers begin pulling miners to safety in the rescue pods. The whole world watched as the miners emerged to safety, culminating a multinational, multi-disciplined team effort involving coordination and cooperation between the teams.

Following the rescue operations, Layne and Geotech received official recognition from U.S. President Barack Obama at the White House.
