= Chilean Safety Association =

Chilean non-profit organization

- Asociación Chilena de Seguridad
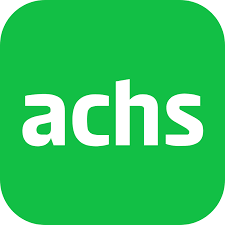

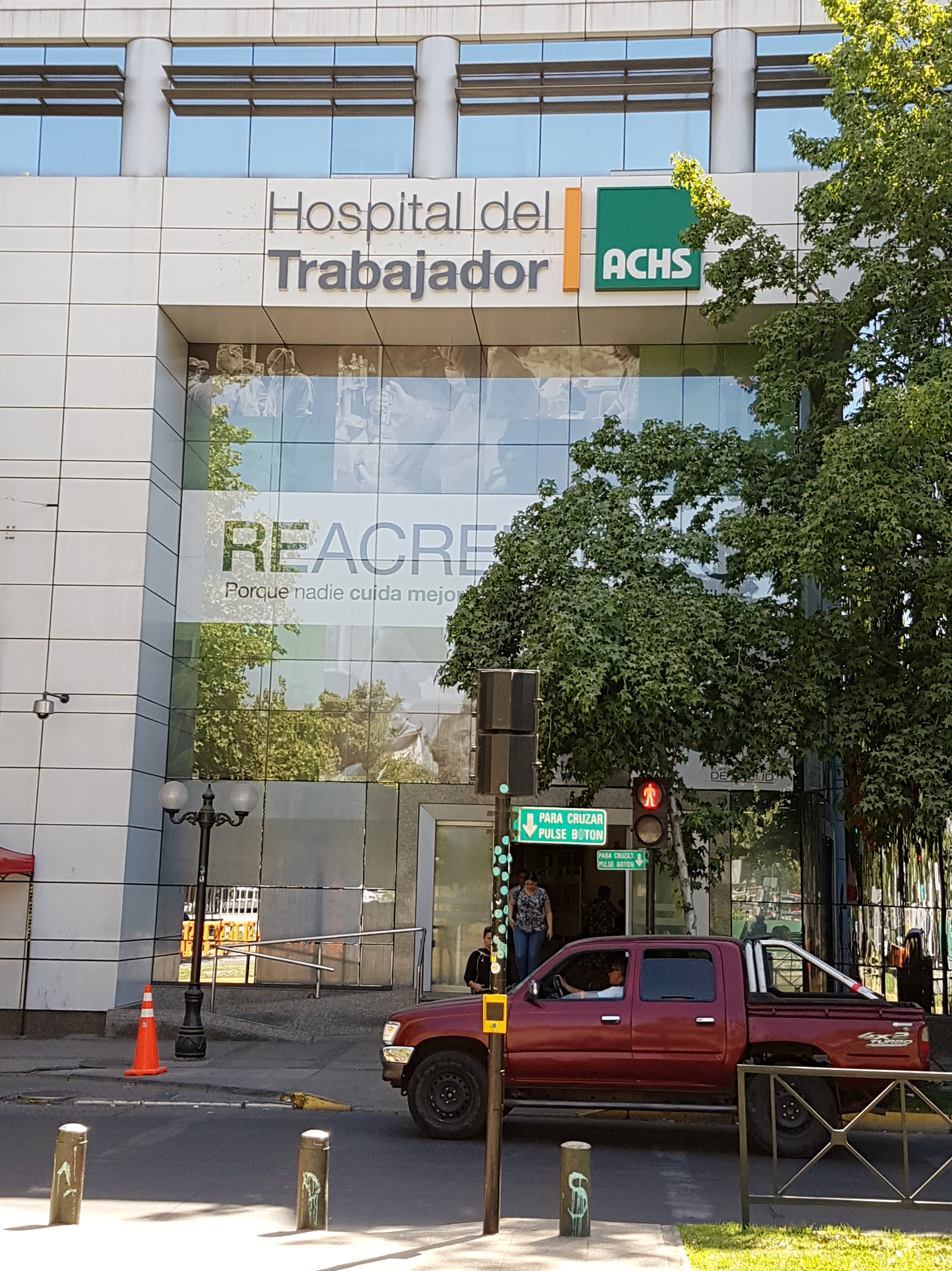
- Worker's Hospital, ACHS
- Abbreviation: ACHS (CSA)
- Formation: May 26, 1956
- Founder: Eugenio Heiremans
- Type: Private
- Legal status: Corporation
- Headquarters: Providencia
- President: Paul Schiodtz Obilinovich (2017–2024)
- CEO: Juan Luis Moreno
- Website: https://www.achs.cl/

The Chilean Safety Association (Spanish: Asociación Chilena de Seguridad, also known as ACHS) is a Chilean private non-profit organization, focused in development of risk prevention programs, and occupational accidents coverage. With more than 2.6 million affiliated workers, more than 73,000 affiliated employment entities throughout Chile and the lowest average accident rate, ACHS is the largest mutual in Chile

All employing entities in Chile, regardless of size, must be affiliated with a Social Security Administration agency against Risks of Occupational Accidents and Diseases under Law No. 16,744. ACHS is one of the three private administrative bodies, whose role is to develop risk prevention programs and provide health coverage and compensation associated with occupational accidents, transport and professional illnesses.

ACHS was created on May 26, 1956, after Ladislao Lira, he promoted the creation of the Chilean Safety Association (ACHS), a non-profit corporation that administers social security against work accidents and occupational diseases. He was executive president of this entity until October 2010, when he resigned for health reasons. He was succeeded in office by Jorge Matetic.
