= Breeze-Eastern =

American Manufacturing company

Breeze-Eastern Corporation
- Type: Public
- Traded as: AMEX: BZC
- Industry: Industrial Goods – Aerospace/Defense Products & Services
- Founded: 1926
- Headquarters: Whippany, New Jersey, U.S.
- Key people: Jason Mercado (Chief Executive Officer, President and Director); Mark D. Mishler (Chief Financial Officer, Chief Accounting Officer) (Aug 24, 2015)
- Revenue: $ 79.61M (Dec 31, 2013)
- Number of employees: 187 (Dec 31, 2013)
- Website: www.breeze-eastern.com

Breeze-Eastern Corporation is an American manufacturing company which was set up in 1926 and is now based in Whippany, New Jersey. Breeze-Eastern is the world's only dedicated helicopter hoist and winch provider and the world's second-largest cargo hook systems manufacturer. The company focuses on engineered equipment for specialty aerospace/defense applications. It also manufactures weapons handling systems and tie-down equipment for military and civilian agencies.

== History ==
Since the company's establishment, it has manufactured equipment for many types of helicopters around the world, such as the compact Agusta A1B, Sikorsky S-58, Sikorsky CH-53 Super Stallion, Sikorsky H-60 Hawk platforms, and Boeing tandem rotor CH-47 Chinook. The company has received supplemental type certificates (STC) from the FAA.

In 2006, TransTechnology Corporation changed its name to Breeze-Eastern Corporation (AMEX:BZC), since its products are known as Breeze-Eastern products.

In 2015, TransDigm Group acquired Breeze-Eastern Corporation in a deal valued at $206 million.

== Products and services ==
The company's products sales represented approximately 75% of its total revenues during the fiscal year ended March 31, 2013 (fiscal 2013). It provides helicopter hoist and cargo hook systems (such as Sikorsky H-60, Blackhawk and Naval Hawk, CH53-K Super Stallion, Bell-Boeing V-22 Osprey, Boeing CH-47 Chinook); hydraulic and electric aircraft cargo winch systems; cargo and aircraft tie-downs; weapons handling systems for the European Multiple-Launch Rocket Systems (MLRS) and the United States High Mobility Artillery Rocket System (HIMARS).
The company's Services include overhaul and maintenance, representing 25% of its total revenues in fiscal 2013.
