= Schramm Inc. =

American drilling rig and equipment manufacturer

Schramm, Inc.
- Type: Private
- Industry: Manufacturing
- Genre: Drilling Rigs
- Founded: 1900
- Founder: Chris Schramm
- Headquarters: West Chester, Pennsylvania, United States
- Area served: Worldwide
- Key people: Dick Schramm (Chairman)
- Products: mobile, top-head, hydraulic drilling rigs
- Website: www.schramminc.com

Schramm, Inc. is a privately held manufacturer of mobile, top-head hydraulic drilling rigs and related equipment for the global mining, energy, and water well industries. In October 2019, it was acquired by GenNx360 Capital Partners. It is headquartered in West Chester, Pennsylvania in the United States. Schramm affiliated sales, parts, and service centers are located in more than 16 countries across the globe, with its primary manufacturing facilities located in Pennsylvania and Western Australia.

Schramm achieved international recognition for its role in the rescue of 33 miners in the 2010 Copiapo Mining Accident.

Schramm's Australian based business is currently under external administration, following a workplace fatality in February 2023. The circumstances leading to the fatality are being investigated by Worksafe WA.

== Company History ==
The company was founded in 1900 by Chris Schramm. It originally manufactured portable air compressors, before switching to rotary drilling rigs in the 1950s. Dick Schramm, who began working for the family business as a manufacturing engineer in 1961, worked his way up the ranks to become President of the company in 1985. He is currently the company Chairman.

In 2015, Schramm acquired Western Australia's AirDrill and AirDrill Hammers and Bits, manufacturers of RC (reverse circulation) hammers and drilling bits. In 2020, Schramm launched a joint venture with Hardwick Machinery in Salt Lake City, Utah, to bolster its global aftermarket service and support operations.

On 13 February 2023, a workplace fatality occurred at Schramm Australia's headquarters in Welshpool, Western Australia. Worksafe WA are investigating whether Schramm's negligence contributed to the fatality. Following the fatality, on 22 February 2023, the company appointed Administrators over its Australian entities, AirDrill Pty Ltd, AirDrill Hammers and Bits Pty Ltd and Schramm Australia Holding Pty Ltd.

== 2010 Copiapó mining accident ==
In 2010, Schramm, Inc. assisted in the rescue of 33 miners trapped for 69 days as a result of the Copiapó mining accident in Chile. The company built both drilling rigs that were key in saving the miners. The Schramm T685 WS truck mounted drill bored a 5.5 inches (14 cm) hole that, on 22 August 2010, was the first to break through to the 33 trapped men, confirming they had survived the accident. The company also manufactured the T130XD air core drilling rig owned by Geotec S.A., a Chilean-American joint venture drilling company. The T130 heavy drill was chosen by the general contractor for Plan B, Chilean firm Drillers Supply S.A., to widen one of the three 5.5 inches (14 cm) wide and 700 metres (2,300 ft) deep boreholes that were already used to keep the miners supplied using palomas. The T130 rig, in a three-way international race, was the first to open an escape shaft to the men.
