= Franklin Lobos =

Chilean footballer and miner (born 1957)

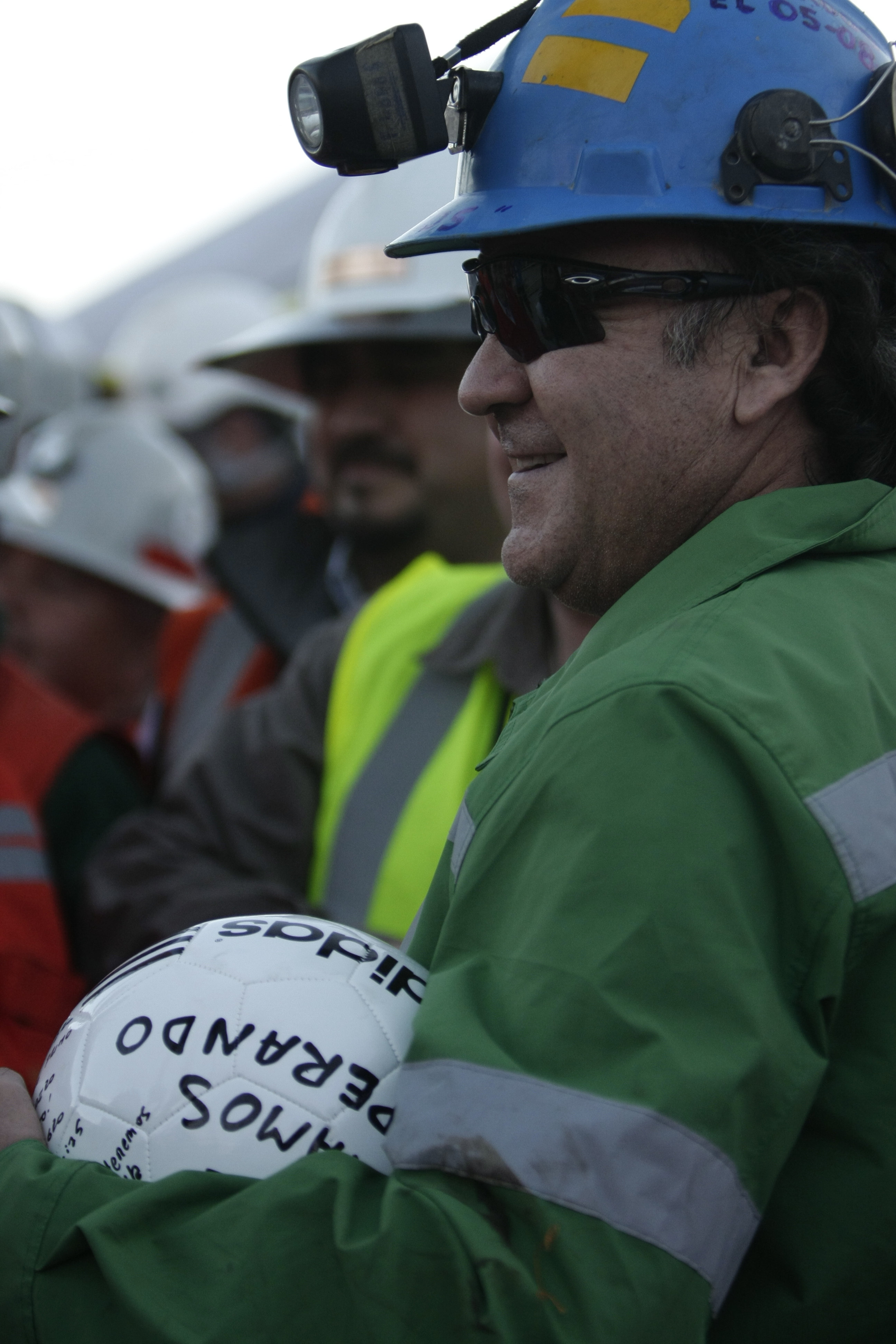
- Lobos following his rescue from the 2010 Copiapó mining accident

Personal information
- Full name: Franklin Erasmo Lobos Ramírez
- Date of birth: June 2, 1957 (age 69)
- Place of birth: Copiapó, Chile
- Position: Midfielder

Senior career*
Years	Team	Apps	(Gls)
1980–1981	Regional Atacama		
1982	Deportes Antofagasta		
1983–1985	Cobresal		
1986–1987	Deportes Antofagasta		
1988–1989	Cobresal		
1990–1991	La Serena		
1992	Santiago Wanderers		
1993	Municipal Iquique		
1994	Unión La Calera		
1995	Regional Atacama		

International career
- Chile Olympic
- * Club domestic league appearances and goals

Franklin Erasmo Lobos Ramírez (born June 2, 1957 in Copiapó) is a retired Chilean footballer. Lobos debuted in 1980 for Regional Atacama, and retired in 1995, playing for the same club he started his career with. He was nicknamed El Mortero Mágico (The Magic Mortar). He eventually became a miner and was one of the miners trapped underground for two months in the 2010 Copiapó mining accident. On October 13, 2010, Lobos was the 27th of 33 miners to be rescued.

== Football career ==
=== Club ===
Lobos made his professional debut for Chilean Second Division team Regional Atacama in 1980, scoring in his first match for the club. After leaving Regional Atacama in 1981, Lobos played a year with Deportes Antofagasta before moving to Cobresal in 1983.

In what would be the first of his two stints with Cobresal, Lobos tasted success in his first year as the team representing the small mining town of El Salvador won the 1983 Second Division title. In the national championship of Chile of 1984, Cobresal was runner-up. Lobos returned to Deportes Antofagasta for 1986 and 1987. In 1988, he rejoined Cobresal where he played until 1989.

Until leaving high level football in 1995, Lobos played for a number of clubs including La Serena, Santiago Wanderers, Municipal Iquique and Unión La Calera.

He was known for his powerful free kicks.

=== International ===
Lobos represented Chile in the CONMEBOL Men Pre-Olympic Tournament, a qualifying tournament for the 1984 Olympic Games.

== Honours ==
- Segunda División: 1983 with Cobresal

== After football ==
After his sporting career ended Lobos became a taxi-driver and, in 2005, a miner. He worked as a truck driver in the Copiapó mine, where in August 2010, he was one of the 33 miners trapped in the 2010 Copiapó mining accident. He was the 27th miner to be rescued on October 13 and thus holds the record for the seventh longest time ever being trapped underground. Guinness World Records was asked by the rescue team for all the miners, including Lobos, to be honored with the record.

He has two daughters.
