= Moose River Gold Mines disaster =

1936 mining disaster and rescue

- The mines as they appeared around the time of the disaster
- Date: April 12–23, 1936
- Location: Moose River Gold Mines, Nova Scotia
- Type: Mine collapse and rescue
- Outcome: 2 of 3 miners rescued
- Deaths: 1 (Magill)
- Injuries: 2 (Scadding and Robertson)

On April 12, 1936, the roof of the mine at Moose River Gold Mines collapsed, trapping three miners 141 feet below the surface for eleven days. Two of the miners survived, while one died on the seventh day of the rescue. By April 15, hundreds of radio stations throughout North America were broadcasting the rescue attempt. Coverage eventually spread to Europe. The disaster was the first breaking news story in Canadian history to receive live 24-hour radio coverage. The 1937 Warner Bros. film Draegerman Courage was based on the disaster.

== Background ==
=== Mining in Canada ===
Gold mining has existed in Canada since gold was discovered near the Chaudière River in Quebec in 1828. Gold was discovered in Nova Scotia in 1858 by British army officer Champagn L'Estrange and Mi'kmaq guide Joe Paul, who were moose hunting in the area. Mining began in 1860 when prospector John Gerrish Pulsifer visited the site and realized that gold mining in that area would be profitable. This gold rush did not last long due to poor management and poor mining methods. By 1874, the output of gold declined to less than a third of its highest yield in 1867. A second gold rush began in 1896, but ended in 1903 after mining became easier in the Klondike and Ontario. In the 1920's, an increase in the demand for arsenic lead to the exploration arsenopyrite, an indicator of the presence of gold. This in turn lead to a third rush, which began in 1932.

=== Moose River Gold Mines ===
Mining at Moose River started in 1881. From 1881 to 1889, 26,000 ounces of gold were mined. Following the mine's closure in 1889, the mines were abandoned and fell into disrepair. Equipment started rotting, and shafts began filling with water or debris.The Moose River Mines originally had several shafts serving as entrances to the mines. After the mines closed, all but one of them either collapsed or filled with debris. This shaft became known as the Magill shaft.

The mines reopened in January 1936 after being purchased by lawyer Herman Magill, and the Chief of Staff of Toronto's Sick Kids Hospital, David E. Robertson. Robertson and Magill soon hired Charles Alfred "Alf" Scadding as the mine's bookkeeper and timekeeper. They also hired Felix Henderson to be the mine's manager and Smith Higgins as the mine's hoistman. The dewatering of the mine also started that month. The only surviving shaft allowed people to enter the mine at in incline via a tramcar called a skip. This skip was raised or lowered by cable, and provided the only access to the mines.

== Collapse ==
While dewatering was underway, Henderson became concerned about the condition of the mine's support timbers. Miners also noted that the weight of the mine's roof on the timbers appeared excessive, causing some to break or bulge. However, they did not conclude that the entire mine's condition was in jeopardy. Anticipating a sale of the mine to interests in New York, Robertson and Magill arrived at the mines around Easter weekend 1936 for an inspection tour. They were joined that Saturday by Henderson and Scadding. The four men toured the mines for a few hours before returning to the surface.

On Easter Sunday at around 11:00 p.m., Robertson, Magill, and Scadding returned to the mine without Henderson. Because neither of the three men were experienced miners, they were not concerned by the rotting timber supports. They did however, hear loud noises when they were 300 feet below the surface, so they decided that the mine was not safe to inspect. Hoistman Smith Higgins then raised the men to around 140 feet below the surface. At that level, Magill exited the skip to see what was causing those noises. After a few minutes, the noises became even more concerning. Higgins then returned to the skip, where the men signaled their intention to return to the surface. The mine collapsed just as the men made their signal. The men tried to find another way out of the mine, but they could not find another way out. They were trapped 141 feet below the surface.

== Rescue ==
Map of the mine showing the Reynolds shaft, the Magill shaft, the blockage, and the location of the trapped men.

Rescuers arrived at the scene within minutes of the collapse. Within twelve hours, the men set discarded wooden dynamite boxes on fire to tell rescuers that they were alive via smoke signal. However, the rescuers did not initially know whether the smoke was from a signal fire or merely an explosion as the miners could not verbally communicate with them. The smoke signals ceased within 18 hours, and by April 15, rescuers were still unsure as to whether or not this meant the men were alive. On that day, the government of Nova Scotia ordered rescuers to use a diamond drill to reach the shaft to see if the men were still alive. Because there was no map of the mine, rescuer Billy Bell only drilled in the direction where smoke was coming out of.

By April 18, rescuers drilled a hole that was over 100 feet deep and just over an inch in diameter. The drill hit the shaft at around 11:00 that morning. Rescuers tried to make noise or send objects to the men to let them know that they had reached them, but they received no response as the men did not know that they were signals. At 4:00 that afternoon, the brother-in-law of David Robinson, Charles Ivey told the wives of the men that he had given up hope of finding the men alive. A rescuer then attached a whistle to the drill where it made a shrieking sound. Within minutes, Scadding noticed the drill. He then made his way towards it, tapped it, and shouted 'Hallao'. This initial contact between the trapped men and the rescuers confirmed that that all three men were alive.

Discovering that all three men were alive meant that rescuers had to change their plans for recovering the men. Over 100 volunteers from around Nova Scotia began burrowing a hole in the previously abandoned Reynolds shaft. The new plan was to burrow a tunnel at an angle that would reach the 80 foot level of the Magill shaft, which rescuers hoped would be free enough from debris by that point to eventually reach the men. In the meantime, food was sent to the men via the hole created by the diamond drill.

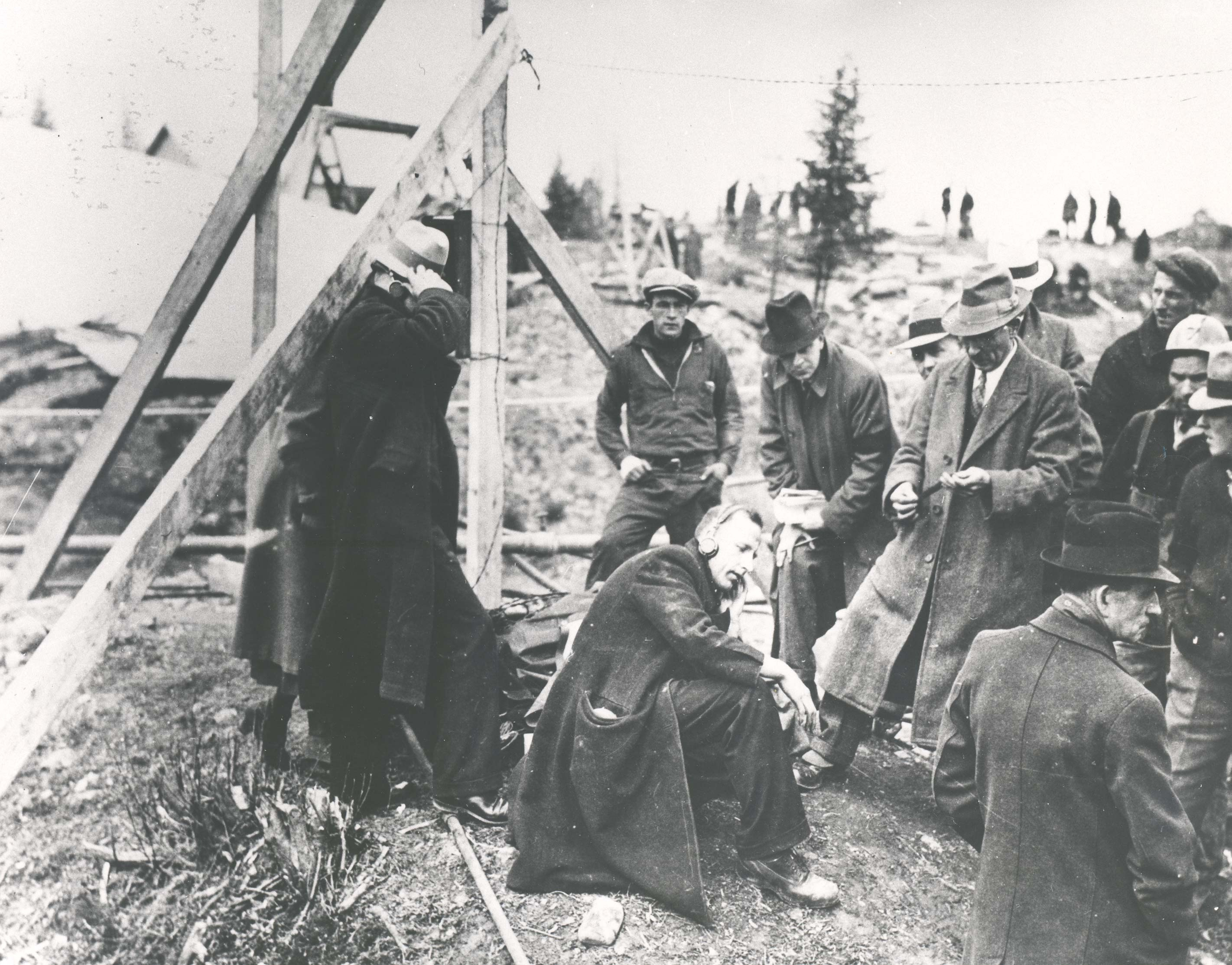
The District superintendent uses earphones to listen for the trapped men

On April 19, Robertson and Scadding signaled to Ivey that Magill had died. He was 30 years old. A doctor from the area later stated that he believed that Magill died from pneumonia, which was caused by malnourishment, and exposure to the cold and damp elements of the mine. Magill's slender physique may have also played a role in his body's inability to tolerate extreme conditions. Scadding then told Henderson exactly where both him and Robertson were. He also told Henderson that debris in the Magill shaft only collapsed 25 to 30 feet above the men as fallen timbers had prevented the debris from crushing the men. This led Henderson to encourage the rescuers to continue their work at the Reynolds shaft.

By this point Robertson and Scadding were vomiting and coughing profusely. On April 21, Scadding started groaning and complaining of trench foot. By April 22, Scadding perked up and told rescuers that he no longer felt pain in his feet, but that Robertson was getting drowsy. The sudden lack of pain in Scadding's feet was caused by the anterior portions of them becoming gangrenous.

On April 23, rescuers finally reached Scadding and Robertson. Blankets, morphine, and brandy were lowered to the men. Nova Scotia's Minister of Health, Frank R. Davis and Minister of Mines, Michael Dwyer also descended into the mine to greet the men. Both men then exited the mine, and were taken by ambulance to a nearby hospital.

== Media coverage ==
In 1951, Canadian sportswriter Trent Frayne referred to the event as "perhaps the most extravagantly covered news story in Canada's history". Over 100 million people around the world listened to all or some of coverage of the rescue on BBC, NBC, CRBC, and many other radio stations. It was the first breaking news event in Canadian history to receive 24-hour radio coverage. Furthermore, many companies did not pay the newspapers advertising fees while the rescue was ongoing as they feared that people were only reading about the rescue and not their advertisements.

== Aftermath ==
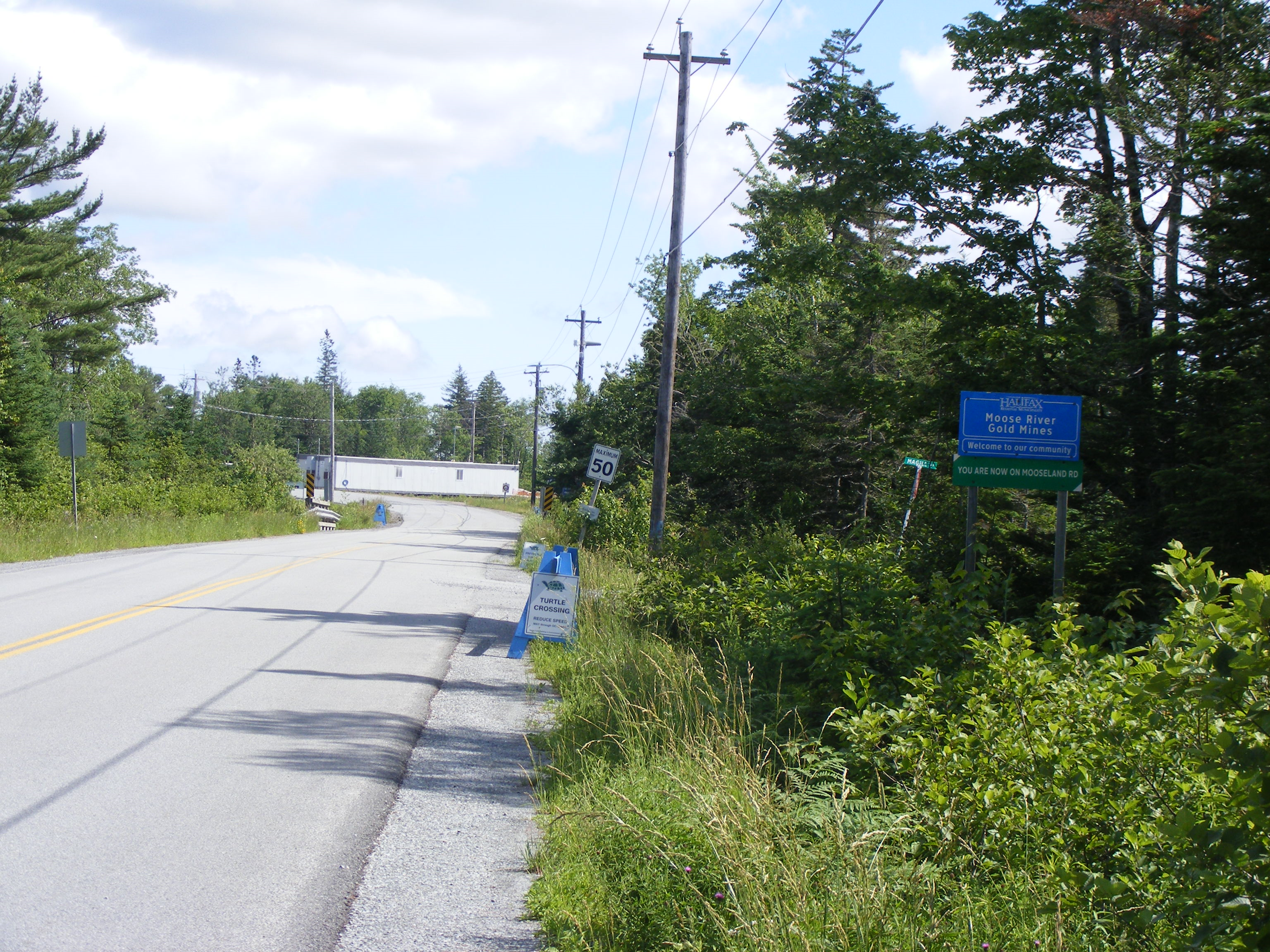
The entrance to Moose River Gold Mines as it appeared in 2023

After the rescue, Robertson continued his work as the chief surgeon of Toronto's Hospital for Sick Children. He was the first doctor in Canada to perform a sympathectomy, which connects nerves to restore life to paralyzed limbs or nerves. He was also one of the leading doctors in the treatment and rehabilitation of children crippled in a Polio epidemic in 1937. He died in 1944 at the age of 60.

Doctors amputated all of Scadding's toes to treat his gangrene. Doctors also recommended amputating his feet at the ankle as circulation had stopped there. Scadding however, refused and instead used a vibration machine to restore circulation to his feet. He died in 1967 at the age of 75.

Louis King directed a film that was based on the disaster and rescue. The film, Draegerman Courage was released by Warner Bros. on May 15, 1937.

== See also ==
- Floyd Collins – a cave explorer who died after 14 days in 1925. The accident scene was a national media frenzy.
- Kathy Fiscus - a three-year-old Californian girl who died after falling down a well in 1949 and whose two-day rescue attempt was broadcast live on radio and national TV.
- Alfredo Rampi – fell down a well and died as a six-year-old in 1981 in Italy. The rescue attempt was broadcast live for 18 hours.
- Jessica McClure – a Texas toddler who survived being trapped in a well for over two days in 1987, while the rescue operation was televised live on CNN.
- 2010 Copiapó mining accident – A mining incident in Chile in 2010 where all 33 miners were rescued after being trapped for 69 days underground.
- Tham Luang cave rescue – A 2018 rescue where all members of a Junior soccer survived after being trapped in a flooded cave for 18 days.
- Julen Rosello – Spanish toddler who fell in 2019 in a well and died after a rescue attempt of 13 days.
- Rayan Oram – Moroccan child who fell into a well and died in 2022.
- 2023 Uttarakhand tunnel rescue – successful rescue of 41 workers trapped inside the tunnel.
