= Elveno Pastorelli =

Elveno Pastorelli (Roccalbegna, 24 September 1930 – Rome, 25 September 1997) was an Italian engineer and prefect, the first operational manager of Italian civil protection.

== Career ==
He joined Vigili del Fuoco as an officer in 1958, and was assigned to the Fire Department of Rome, where he had the opportunity to operate in various events of great notoriety which occurred in the capital and in other regions. These include the Largo Telese massacre in Rome (1972). In 1975 he became commander of the city brigade.

He was appointed prefect in 1982 and from 1984 to 1987 he was the head of the cabinet of the ministry; during this period he wrote a book on the subject, La Protezione Civile Oggi. His resignation coincided with the appointment as head of a special office of the presidency of the council for the distribution of funds to the victims of the 1980 Irpinia earthquake. He was general director and president of the National Fire Brigade. In 1992 he was appointed Grand Officer of the Order of Merit of the Italian Republic.

He became known in particular for his role in the Vermicino rescue operation, and he also worked other rescue operations, such as the 1980 Bologna massacre.

== Vermicino rescue operation ==
In 1981 he was in charge of the rescue operations of Alfredo Rampi, a 6-year-old boy who fell into an artesian well in Vermicino, near Rome. The operation failed, due in part to errors on the part of the rescuers, and the child died a prisoner in the well. The failed rescue, which took place over many days, was followed by many on television. The coverage of the operation, and its failure, made Pastorelli well-known in Italy. Following this incident, president Sandro Pertini urged the creation of a Civil Protection structure, which was formed a few months later with the minister of the new special department at the head, Giuseppe Zamberletti, and Pastorelli general manager.

== Death ==
He died in 1997 at the Clinica Roma Villa Stuart in Rome. He was married and had one son.

== Publications ==
- Pastorelli, Elveno. La Protezione Civile Oggi. Milano: Rusconi, 1986.
