= List of most watched United States television broadcasts of 1989 =

The following is a list of most watched United States television broadcasts of 1989 (single-network only) according to Nielsen.

== Most watched by week ==
Week of	Program	Network	Viewers (millions)	Ref.
January 2	The Cosby Show	NBC	46.1	
January 9	The Cosby Show	NBC	48.4	
January 16	Super Bowl XXIII	NBC	81.6	
January 23	The Cosby Show	NBC	44.1	
January 30	The Cosby Show	NBC	45.7	
February 6	The Cosby Show	NBC	44.2	
February 13	The Cosby Show	NBC	43.8	
February 20	The Cosby Show	NBC	45.0	
February 27	The Cosby Show	NBC	42.3	
March 6	Roseanne	ABC	44.3	
March 13	Roseanne	ABC	41.2	
March 20	Roseanne	ABC	41.2	
March 27	61st Academy Awards	ABC	42.6	
April 3	Roseanne	ABC	36.2	
April 10	Roseanne	ABC	39.2	
April 17	Roseanne	ABC	41.8	
April 24	Roseanne	ABC	33.2	
May 1	Roseanne	ABC	35.8	
May 8	Family Ties	NBC	36.3	
May 15	Everybody's Baby: The Rescue of Jessica McClure	ABC	37.6	
May 22	I Know My First Name Is Steven, Part 2	NBC	40.3	
May 29	Roseanne	ABC	31.8	
June 5	Roseanne	ABC	28.5	
June 12	Roseanne	ABC	29.0	
June 19	Roseanne	ABC	27.6	
June 26	Roseanne	ABC	26.9	
July 3	Cheers	NBC	24.1	
July 10	Roseanne	ABC	26.3	
July 17	Roseanne	ABC	26.2	
July 24	Roseanne	ABC	25.5	
July 31	Roseanne	ABC	28.5	
August 7	Roseanne	ABC	28.2	
August 14	Roseanne	ABC	27.9	
August 21	Roseanne	ABC	30.4	
August 28	Roseanne	ABC	30.1	
September 4	Cheers	NBC	26.5	
September 11	Roseanne	ABC	39.4	
September 18	The Cosby Show	NBC	39.3	
September 25	Roseanne	ABC	41.7	
October 2	Roseanne	ABC	43.5	
October 9	Roseanne	ABC	40.8	
October 16	The Cosby Show	NBC	38.0	
October 23	Roseanne	ABC	38.6	
October 30	The Cosby Show	NBC	40.2	
November 6	The Cosby Show	NBC	42.3	
November 13	The Cosby Show	NBC	41.8	
November 20	Roseanne	ABC	38.8	
November 27	The Cosby Show	NBC	42.8	
December 4	The Cosby Show	NBC	37.4	
December 11	Roseanne	ABC	37.3	
December 18	Roseanne	ABC	33.8	
December 25	AFC Wild Card Game	NBC	36.1	
