= Ace in the Hole (1951 film) =

1951 film by Billy Wilder

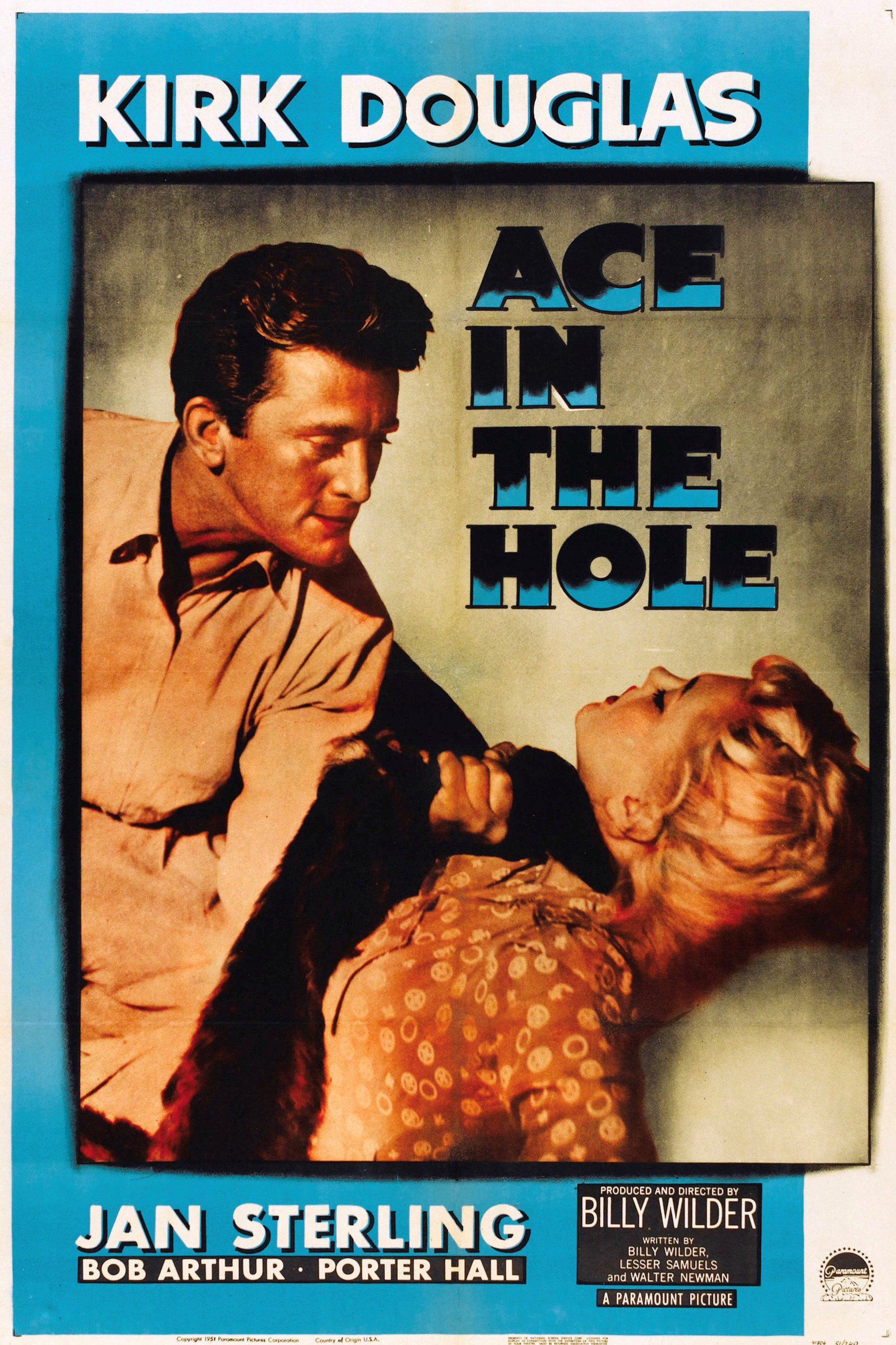
- Theatrical release poster
- Directed by: Billy Wilder
- Written by: Billy Wilder; Lesser Samuels; Walter Newman
- Story by: Victor Desny (uncredited)
- Produced by: Billy Wilder
- Starring: Kirk Douglas; Jan Sterling; Robert Arthur; Ray Teal; Porter Hall
- Cinematography: Charles Lang
- Edited by: Doane Harrison; Arthur P. Schmidt
- Music by: Hugo Friedhofer
- Distributed by: Paramount Pictures
- Release date: June 14, 1951
- Running time: 111 minutes
- Country: United States
- Language: English
- Budget: $1.8 million
- Box office: $1.3 million (rentals)

Ace in the Hole, also known as The Big Carnival, is a 1951 American satirical drama film directed, produced, and co-written by Billy Wilder. The film stars Kirk Douglas as a cynical, disgraced reporter who creates a media circus surrounding a man trapped in a cave in rural New Mexico to try to regain a job on a major newspaper. The film co-stars Jan Sterling and features Robert Arthur and Porter Hall.

The film marked a series of firsts for Wilder: it was the first time he was involved in a project as a writer, producer, and director; his first film after parting ways with his long-time writing partner Charles Brackett; and his first film to be a critical and commercial failure, though it has since been reappraised as one of his major works.

Without consulting Wilder, Paramount Pictures executive Y. Frank Freeman changed the title to The Big Carnival just prior to its release. Early television broadcasts retained that title, but when aired by Turner Classic Movies – and when released on DVD by The Criterion Collection in July 2007 – it reverted to Ace in the Hole.

In 2017, the film was selected for preservation in the United States National Film Registry by the Library of Congress as being "culturally, historically, or aesthetically significant".

The film is sometimes referred to as a film noir, though author Eddie Muller disputes this.

== Plot ==
After being fired from eleven major newspapers due to his behavior, temper, and alcoholism, Charles "Chuck" Tatum winds up in Albuquerque, New Mexico, and offers himself to the publisher of the small Sun-Bulletin. Skeptical of Tatum, editor and publisher Jacob Boot hires him for $60.

A year later, Tatum has grown bored with the slow pace of Albuquerque life. Boot sends Tatum and the newspaper's young photographer, Herbie Cook (played by Robert Arthur), to cover a rattlesnake hunt. When they stop for gas, the pair learn about Leo Minosa, a local man trapped in a collapsed cliff dwelling, and the two investigate. Tatum talks his way past the deputy sheriff and enters the cave with Cook. Despite falling rocks, Tatum ventures close enough to Leo to pass him some amenities. Tatum takes photographs of the trapped man, tries to cheer him up, and begins scheming his big story.

Leo's wife Lorraine (Jan Sterling) is eager to leave Leo and their struggling gas station and diner, but as tourists flock to the rescue site, the financial windfall leads her to go along with Tatum's scheme. After filing an initial report on the accident, Tatum persuades local sheriff Gus Kretzer (played by Ray Teal) to give him exclusive access to Leo in return for reportage that will guarantee Kretzer's reelection.

Kretzer and Tatum convince construction contractor Sam Smollett (played by Frank Jaquet) to drill down to Leo from above rather than through the cave, extending the rescue time from twelve hours to a week to keep the story going, the sheriff pressuring him into this as he is the police contractor. The rescue site becomes an all-day carnival and Tatum starts drinking again. Cook loses his idealism and dreams of selling pictures to high-profile papers. Tatum quits the Sun-Bulletin, persuading Cook to quit with him, and talks Nagel, his former boss in New York, into hiring him to report exclusively from the scene for $1,000 a day. Meanwhile, the carnival atmosphere builds, with a carousel and a ferris wheel operating on the site, New Mexico's first television station, KOB-TV, broadcasting from the scene, while a Santa Fe Railway train, the Leo Moreno Special unloads a throng of new onlookers.

Five days into the event, Leo develops pneumonia and is given twelve hours to live. Tatum sends a news flash to Nagel: Leo will be rescued in twelve hours. However, Smollett tells him that shoring up the cave walls is now impossible due to the drilling. Leo tells Tatum that there is a fifth-year anniversary present for Lorraine in their bedroom. Tatum forces a reluctant Lorraine to open the gift, a fur stole, and Tatum makes her wear it. She protests, and Tatum begins to choke her with the stole. She stabs Tatum with a pair of scissors, and he drives away to the local church.

Tatum takes the local priest to Leo to administer his last rites, and Leo dies shortly thereafter. Tatum announces this to the crowd, proclaiming that "the circus is over." The other reporters send off the story to their newspapers ahead of Tatum. The carnival and crowd pack up to leave, and Lorraine hitch-hikes out of town. Tatum stumbles into his room, where Cook tells him that Nagel has fired him for letting other newspapers break the story of Leo's death. Tatum calls Nagel and tries to confess to killing Leo and purposely delaying the rescue, but Nagel hangs up on him without hearing his confession. Tatum and Cook drive back to the Sun-Bulletin offices, where a drunken Tatum asks Boot for his job back. He collapses from his stab wound and dies beneath an embroidered sign reading "Tell The Truth".

== Cast ==
- Kirk Douglas as Charles "Chuck" Tatum
- Jan Sterling as Lorraine Minosa
- Robert Arthur as Herbie Cook
- Porter Hall as Jacob Q. Boot, editor, publisher, and owner of the Albuquerque Sun-Bulletin
- Frank Cady as Al Federber, tourist and Pacific All-Risk insurance salesman
- Geraldine Hall as Nellie Federber
- Richard Benedict as Leo Minosa
- Ray Teal as Sheriff Gus Kretzer
- Lewis Martin as McCardle
- John Berkes as Papa Minosa
- Frances Dominguez as Mama Minosa
- Gene Evans as Deputy Sheriff
- Frank Jaquet as Sam Smollett
- Harry Harvey Sr. as Dr. Hilton
- Bob Bumpas as radio announcer
- Richard Gaines as Nagel, the New York newspaper editor
- Bert Moorhouse as Josh Morgan (uncredited)
- Iron Eyes Cody as Indian Copy Boy (uncredited)

== Production ==
=== Development ===
The film's plot has similarities with two real-life events that ended in tragedy. The first involved W. Floyd Collins, who in 1925 was trapped inside Sand Cave, Kentucky, following a landslide. The Louisville Courier-Journal jumped on the story by dispatching reporter William Burke Miller to the scene. Miller's enterprising coverage turned the tragic episode into a national event and earned him a Pulitzer Prize. Collins is cited in the film as an example of a cave-in victim who becomes a media sensation. The second event took place in April 1949. Three-year-old Kathy Fiscus of San Marino, California, fell into an abandoned well and, during a rescue operation that lasted several days, thousands of people arrived to watch the action unfold. In both cases, the victims died before they were rescued.

After the film's release, screenwriter Victor Desny sued Wilder for plagiarism, because he had contacted Wilder's secretary Rosella Stewart to propose a film based on the story of Floyd Collins in November 1949. Wilder's attorneys responded that, not only did an oral plot summary not constitute a formal story submission, but the Collins case was historical in nature and as such was not protected by copyright laws. In December 1953, Judge Stanley Mosk ruled in favor of Wilder and Paramount. Desny appealed, and in August 1956 the Supreme Court of California ruled that his oral submission had been legitimate. Wilder's attorneys settled that same month, paying Desny $14,350 (equivalent to $170,000 in 2025).

=== Writing ===
In the original script, Tatum colluded with the local sheriff. Joseph Breen of the Hays Code office strongly objected to the on-screen depiction of a corrupt law enforcement officer, and insisted Wilder add dialogue making it clear the man eventually would be made to answer for his actions.

=== Filming ===
The final cost of the film was $1,821,052, of which $250,000 was paid to Wilder as writer, producer and director. Its exterior set, (35°23′49″N 109°01′09″W), which was constructed 19 miles west of Gallup, New Mexico, was the largest non-combat set ever constructed at the time. It measured 235 feet (72 m) high, 1,200 feet (370 m) wide, and 1,600 feet (490 m) deep and included an ancient cliff dwelling, collapsed cave, roadside stands, parking lots and a carnival site. Underground scenes were filmed in a mock-up at the Paramount Studios on Melrose Avenue in Hollywood. More than 1,000 extras and 400 cars were utilized in the crowd scenes. After the film was completed, Paramount charged admission to the set.

Frank Cady's character identifies himself as a salesman for Pacific All-Risk Insurance, a fictitious company featured in Wilder's 1944 film Double Indemnity.

=== Soundtrack ===
Jay Livingston and Ray Evans wrote the song "We're Coming, Leo" performed by a vocalist and band at the carnival.

== Reception ==
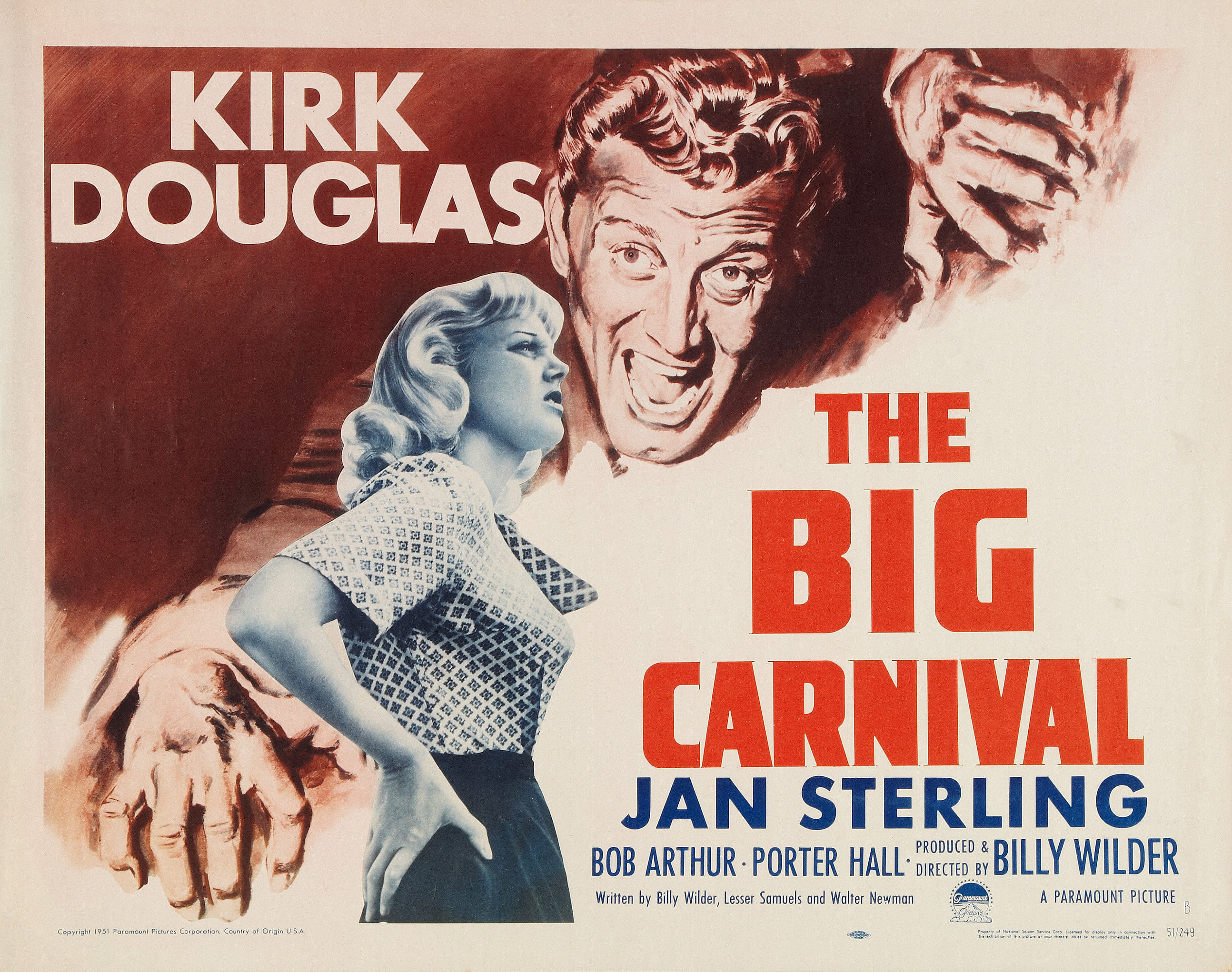
Alternate poster with the title The Big Carnival

=== Contemporary ===
Contemporary critics found little to admire. In his review in The New York Times, Bosley Crowther called it "a masterly film", but added: "Mr. Wilder has let imagination so fully take command of his yarn that it presents not only a distortion of journalistic practice but something of a dramatic grotesque ... [it] is badly weakened by a poorly constructed plot, which depends for its strength upon assumptions that are not only naïve but absurd. There isn't any denying that there are vicious newspaper men and that one might conceivably take advantage of a disaster for his own private gain. But to reckon that one could so tie up and maneuver a story of any size, while other reporters chew their fingers, is simply incredible".

The Hollywood Reporter called it "ruthless and cynical ... a distorted study of corruption and mob psychology that ... is nothing more than a brazen, uncalled-for slap in the face of two respected and frequently effective American institutions – democratic government and the free press". Variety was more positive, noting that "the performances are fine. Douglas enacts the heel reporter ably, giving it color to balance its unsympathetic character. Jan Sterling also is good in a role that has no softening touches, and Benedict's victim portrayal is first-rate. Billy Wilder's direction captures the feel of morbid expectancy that always comes out in the curious that flock to scenes of tragedy".

Film critic Manny Farber in The Nation, July 14, 1951, wrote:

Ace in the Hole is built chiefly round the acting of a tough, corrupt newshound by Kirk Douglas. Douglas plays it in the worst style of the Yiddish theatre, bursting with self-pity, slowing everything with a muscular, tensed-up technique, and ranting as though he were trying to break the hearts of people blocks away from the theatre. His conceited hamming is pretty typical of the whole show…”

=== Retrospective ===
The film later found respect among critics. Roger Ebert of the Chicago Sun-Times wrote in 2007: "Although the film is 56 years old, I found while watching it again that it still has all its power. It hasn't aged because Wilder and his co-writers, Walter Newman and Lesser Samuels, were so lean and mean [with their dialogue] ... [Kirk Douglas'] focus and energy ... is almost scary. There is nothing dated about [his] performance. It's as right-now as a sharpened knife".

Dave Kehr in the Chicago Reader called it "cold, lurid, and fascinating". Nathan Lee of The Village Voice wrote: "Here is, half a century out of the past, a movie so acidly au courant it stings".

Time Out wrote: "As a diatribe against all that is worst in human nature, it has moments dipped in pure vitriol". TV Guide called it "a searing example of writer-director Billy Wilder at his most brilliantly misanthropic" and "an uncompromising portrait of human nature at its worst", concluding that it was "one of the great American films of the 1950s".

Ed Gonzalez of Slant wrote that the film "allowed Wilder to question the very nature of human interest stories and the twisted relationship between the American media and its public. More than 50 years after the film's release, when magazines compete to come up with the cattiest buzz terms and giddily celebrate the demise of celebrity relationships for buffo bucks, Ace in the Hole feels more relevant than ever".

The film was included in Roger Ebert's list of "The Great Movies" in 2007. In 2008, Empire ranked it at number 385 in its list of the 500 greatest movies of all time. In 2015, the film ranked last on BBC's "100 Greatest American Films" list.

On the review aggregator website Rotten Tomatoes, 88% of 89 critics' reviews are positive. The website's consensus reads: "Spearheaded by an excellent Kirk Douglas, Ace in the Hole is an incisive and sardonic satire that, much like its opportunistic hero, never lets moral compunction get in the way of a good story." Metacritic, which uses a weighted average, assigned the film a score of 72 out of 100, based on 6 critics, indicating "generally favorable" reviews.

=== Genre ===
In his Slate review, Jack Shafer wrote in 2007: "If film noir illustrates the crackup of the American dream ... Ace in the Hole is an exemplar of the form". Eddie Muller, founder and president of the Film Noir Foundation, stated that Ace in the Hole incorrectly gets labeled as a film noir, and that it is more of a film about sleazy journalism.

== Awards and nominations ==
Wins

- National Board of Review Award: Best Actress – Jan Sterling; 1951.
- Venice Film Festival: International Award for Best Director – Billy Wilder; 1951.
- Venice Film Festival: Best Music – Hugo Friedhofer; 1951.

Nomination

- Academy Award for Best Story and Screenplay – Billy Wilder, Lesser Samuels and Walter Newman; 1952.
- Venice Film Festival: Golden Lion – Billy Wilder; 1951.

== Legacy ==
The 1992 The Simpsons episode "Radio Bart" largely parallels the storyline of Ace in the Hole, with Bart Simpson convincing the public that a boy named "Timmy O'Toole" had fallen into a well, prompting news coverage and charity campaigns. Writer Jon Vitti noted that series creator Matt Groening "came in out of nowhere and just gave me, start to finish, the whole story."

== See also ==
- Media circus

== Sources ==
- Farber, Manny. 2009. Farber on Film: The Complete Film Writings of Manny Farber. Edited by Robert Polito. Library of America. ISBN 978-1-59853-050-6
- Sikov, Ed (1998). On Sunset Boulevard: The Life and Times of Billy Wilder. New York: Hyperion. ISBN 0-7868-6194-0.

Further reading

- Armstrong, Richard (February 2002). "Ace in the Hole". Senses of Cinema. Archived from the original on October 3, 2009.
  - Freely accessible essay by Richard Armstrong, who published a biography of Wilder in 2000.
- Maddin, Guy (July 16, 2007). "Ace in the Hole: Chin Up for Mother". The Criterion Collection.
  - Maddin is a filmmaker; publication of this essay accompanied the 2007 DVD release of Ace in the Hole by The Criterion Collection.
