= Selvotta =

Selvotta may refer to:

- Selvotta (Formello), hamlet of Formello, in the province of Rome, Lazio, Italy
- Selvotta (Frascati), locality of Frascati, in the province of Rome, Lazio, Italy
- Selvotta (Rome), hamlet of Rome, Lazio, Italy
- Selvotta (Rocca d'Evandro), locality of Rocca d'Evandro, in the province of Caserta, Campania, Italy
- Selvotta (Sesto Campano), locality of Sesto Campano, in the province of Isernia, Molise, Italy
