= William F. Collins =

William F. Collins may refer to:

- William Floyd Collins (1887–1925), pioneer cave explorer
- William F. Collins, World War II air ace
