= Death of Julen Roselló =

Two-year-old Spanish boy child who fell into a well and died in 2019

- Date: January 13, 2019
- Location: Totalán, Málaga, Spain
- Cause: Falling down an illegally drilled shaft

Julen Roselló García was a two-year-old Spanish boy who died after falling 109 m (358 ft) into a narrow illegally excavated shaft in Totalán, Málaga, Spain on January 13, 2019. The shaft was 110 m (360 ft) deep and 25 cm (9.8 in) in diameter.

Rescuers drilled a parallel shaft with a wider diameter to reach the child. The operation involved over 300 people and heavy machinery. The rescue attempt attracted international media attention.

After several challenges in the excavation process, Julen's body was found on January 26, 2019, at 1:25 a.m.

== Incident ==
Julen fell into the shaft while playing near a picnic site with his parents, José and Vicky, in Totalán, Spain. His mother was making a phone call while his father was preparing food. The shaft had been drilled in December 2018 by an entrepreneur searching for groundwater without authorization. It was left uncovered, though the owner claimed it was covered with rocks. His father heard him cry, but soil collapsed into the hole as he tried to reach Julen, and the cries stopped. Nearby hikers heard the parents' cries for help and called emergency services.

== Rescue operation ==
Authorities determined that the unstable terrain required careful excavation to avoid landslides. Heavy machinery was brought in to dig a parallel shaft and create a horizontal tunnel to reach the boy. Miners from Asturias, trained in underground rescues, participated in the operation. The operation faced delays due to the rocky terrain and explosives were eventually used to clear obstacles. Julen's body was found on January 26, 2019.

=== Recovery ===
On January 26 at 1:25 a.m. local time, rescuers located Julen's body in the well. An autopsy revealed that he suffered "severe head trauma" from the 71-metre (233 ft) fall and presumably died instantly.

=== Search and rescue team ===
The Mining Rescue Brigade, which traveled from Asturias, sent eight of its best elite miners to the rescue operation. The elite brigade has received several awards and distinctions for their work, such as the gold medal for Merit in Work (1972), and the Silver Medal of the Principality of Asturias (1990) and Silver Medal of the Red Cross (2005).

=== Uncertainties ===
One of the biggest questions about the rescue in the well of Totalán is the origin of the ground plug that hindered access to Julen. Experts understand that this ground plug comes from the sides of the well and was dragged by his body during his fall, so it could be a landslide. Another theory is that, as it is an abandoned well, it is normal for the lateral walls to fall. Specialists say that it is understandable that the humidity, due to the effects of the rain, will wear away the walls and lose consistency, causing the sand or the surrounding earth to detach inside the pit.

Nobody could explain, of the 300 people who worked in Julen's rescue, how the plug of dirt was so compact. A series of questions arose that the experts tried to answer. They say that it is unlikely that the plug was formed by the dirt dragged by his fall, given that the type of perforation is supposed to be clean, with no remains of sand or dirt. Another question is how quickly the plug has been compacted, assuring the experts that if it were dry sand, as it seemed to be, it would have taken weeks to form, and in this case it did in the first 24 hours. Even so, one of the certainties that exists is that from where the plug is to the bottom of the well there is a distance of 39 m (128 ft).

== Legal consequences ==
The High Court of Justice of Andalusia opened an investigation into the circumstances leading up to Julen's death after a report of the Civil Guard.

Independent of the rescue in the interior of the well, the Civil Guard began an investigation into Julen's death. The Ninth Court of Instruction of Málaga opened proceedings to know the exact circumstances in which Julen fell on the well. The proceedings were initiated after an attestation made by the Civil Guard after taking the parents' declaration of the minor, the owner of the land and the person who dug the well in mid-December of the previous year.

== In media ==
The accident and subsequent recovery of Julen received extensive media coverage by Spanish and foreign media. On television networks, the event was addressed in both news programs and morning and afternoon shows that recorded record audience numbers. El programa de Ana Rosa de Telecinco expanded its regular schedule and dedicated special programs to the case. Sálvame, another Spanish program, covered the events of the final hours of the rescue.

The media coverage was criticized by other journalists who described it as a "media circus" and accused various media outlets of encouraging morbidity and sensationalism. The Andalusian Audiovisual Council announced that it would study the media coverage of the case due to a possible violation of the rights of the minor's relatives.

=== Hoax denial ===
On 24 January, the Civil Guard, through its official Twitter account, was forced to deny a hoax that went viral and circulated through social networks, especially WhatsApp, claiming that the Civil Guard was investigating an alternative theory about what happened and that it had forbidden journalists from discussing it.

== Timeline ==
- On Sunday, 13 January 2019, Julen Roselló García, age 2, was spending the day with his family when, around 2;00 p.m., he fell into a well located on a private farm. A group of pedestrians heard his parents' screams and called the emergency team immediately.
- On 14 January, a camera goes down to 73 m (240 ft) deep and locates a bag of sweets and a plastic cup inside the well, which belong to Julen. Rescue teams can not get down any more by running into a hard dirt plug, assuming he is under it.
- On 15 January, a group of technicians and specialists was called, opting for the opening of a lateral and a horizontal tunnel between 50 and 80 m (160 and 260 ft), as the best option to reach Julen. The preparatory works begin.
- On 16 January, it is confirmed by DNA tests that hair from Julen has been found inside the well. It transpires that the works for the well did not have permission from the Council of Andalucía and his father, Jose, appears before the media to say that he and his wife, Vicki, are still hopeful that Julen is alive.
- On 17 January, the rescue teams decided to suspend the construction of a horizontal tunnel due to landslides and hardness of the terrain. The level of the hill was reduced by 15 m (49 ft) and the construction of two vertical tunnels was then decided.
- On 18 January, the heavy machinery drilled to open a vertical tunnel parallel to the well and they run into a slate rock mass at 18 m (59 ft) depth, which again complicates the rescue work.
- On 23 January, the rescue team reduces the diameter of the pipe intended for vertical drilling.
- On 25 January, the miners advance in the final search in the well. The rescue team excavates almost 3 m (9.8 ft) of the 3.8 m (12 ft) that they had to drill to reach the bottom and have to make up to four microblasts to break hard rock (quartzite).
- On 26 January at 1:25 a.m., the rescue teams accessed the point of the well where Julen was sought and located his body between two layers of earth. A judicial commission was activated.

== See also ==
- Kathy Fiscus (1945–1949), American child who fell into a well and died
- Alfredo Rampi (1975–1981; nicknamed Alfredino), Italian child who fell into a well and died
- Jessica McClure (born 1986; nicknamed Baby Jessica), American child who fell into a well in 1987 and was rescued
- Rayan Aourram (born 2016 or 2017; died 2022), Moroccan child who fell into a well and died
