= Kathy Fiscus =

American girl who died in a well (1945–1949)

In April 1949, reporter Stan Chambers covered the Kathy Fiscus tragedy for KTLA.

Kathryn Anne Fiscus (August 21, 1945 – April 8, 1949) was a three-year-old girl who died after falling into a well in San Marino, California. The attempted rescue, broadcast live on KTLA, was a landmark event in American television history.

== Rescue attempt ==
On the afternoon of April 8, 1949, Kathy was playing with her nine-year-old sister, Barbara, and cousin, Gus, in a field in San Marino when she fell down the 14-inch-wide (36 cm) shaft of an abandoned water well. Her father, David, worked for the California Water and Telephone Co., which had drilled the well in 1903. He had recently testified before the state legislature for a proposed law that would require the cementing of all old wells.

Within hours, a major rescue effort was underway with "drills, derricks, bulldozers, and trucks from a dozen towns, three giant cranes, and 50 floodlights from Hollywood studios." At one point a rope was lowered to her but she could not maintain her hold on it and fell even further down the well. After digging down 100 feet (30 m), workers reached Kathy on the night of Sunday April 10.

It was immediately apparent that Kathy was dead. It was impossible to move her because of the position of her legs. A rope was lowered from the top of the well and tied around her to gently pull her into a different posture from which Dr. Robert McCullock, one of the Fiscus family physicians, working from the lateral shaft, was able to free her. Contractor Bill Yancey brought her to the surface.

Kathy's family was informed immediately. Over an hour later Dr. Paul Hanson made this statement to the more than 10,000 people who had gathered to watch the rescue: "Kathy is dead and apparently has been dead since she was last heard speaking on Friday. Her family has been notified and we are now notifying you. Dr. McCullock has pronounced Kathy dead and is assisting in the removal of the body. For the sake of the family who have held up so gallantly through this ordeal—and for all the people who have aided so magnificently, we ask you please to leave the scene of the accident as a courtesy to them. If this had been your child, we are sure you would not want a crowd remaining at the scene of the tragedy." He then read a message from her family: "There is nothing we can say to fully thank the many people who have helped us so selflessly. Many of these people have gone home to much-needed rest. Our heartfelt gratitude goes out to them for the many sacrifices beyond belief. Thank you very much." It was determined that she died shortly after the second fall, from a lack of oxygen.

The failed rescue attempt received nationwide attention in the US as it was carried live on radio and on television—a still-new medium—by station KTLA and their reporter Stan Chambers at the beginning of his career. It is regarded as a watershed event in live TV coverage. Stan Chambers devoted two chapters to it in his book KTLA's News at 10 and added "Historians in 1994 agree that the Kathy Fiscus telecast marked the beginning of the long form of television news coverage."

== Legacy ==
Fiscus's story was recalled nearly 40 years later during the successful 1987 rescue of Jessica McClure.

The location of the well is on the upper field of San Marino High School and is unmarked except for a cap covering the opening.

Kathy was buried at Glen Abbey Memorial Park in Bonita, California on April 13, 1949. The inscription on her marker reads, "One Little Girl Who United the World for a Moment".

Country singer Jimmie Osborne wrote and recorded the 1949 song "The Death of Little Kathy Fiscus" (King 788). It sold over one million copies and Osborne donated half the proceeds to the Fiscus family. Other artists recorded versions of the song, including Kitty Wells and Howard Vokes.

The films The Well (1951), Ace in the Hole (1951), and -30- (1959) were also partially inspired by the event.

An episode of Irwin Allen's series Land of the Giants, "Rescue", is said to be based on the event.

The event is recreated in Woody Allen's 1987 comedy-drama film Radio Days.

== See also ==
- Floyd Collins († 1925)
- Alfredo Rampi († 1981)
- Jessica McClure (1987, survived)
- Julen Roselló († 2019)
- Rayan Aourram († 2022)
