= Stan Chambers =

American television reporter

- Chambers covering the Kathy Fiscus tragedy in April 1949
- Born: Stanley Holroyd Chambers; August 11, 1923; Los Angeles, California, U.S.
- Died: February 13, 2015 (aged 91); Holmby Hills, Los Angeles, California, U.S.
- Resting place: Holy Cross Cemetery, Culver City, California, U.S.
- Education: University of Southern California
- Occupation: Television reporter
- Years active: 1947–2010
- Employer: KTLA
- Relatives: Jaime Chambers (grandson)
- Awards: Emmy Awards; Golden Mike Awards; LA Press Club Award; Star on the Hollywood Walk of Fame

Stanley Holroyd "Stan" Chambers (August 11, 1923 – February 13, 2015) was an American television reporter who worked for KTLA in Los Angeles from 1947 to 2010.

Chambers was born in Los Angeles. His career began shortly after KTLA became the first commercially licensed TV station in the western United States. His April 1949 on-scene 27½-hour report of the unsuccessful attempt to rescue Kathy Fiscus from an abandoned well in San Marino, California, prompted the sale of hundreds of TV sets in the Los Angeles area. His report has been recognized as the first live coverage of a breaking news story.

In 1952, Chambers was involved in the first live telecast of an atomic bomb test at the Nevada Test Site. Among other stories he covered were the 1961 Bel Air fires, the 1963 Baldwin Hills Reservoir dam break, the 1971 Sylmar and 1994 Northridge earthquakes, the 1963 kidnapping of Frank Sinatra Jr., the 1965 Watts Riots, the assassination of Robert F. Kennedy, the Tate-LaBianca murders by the Manson family, and the Hillside Strangler. Chambers broke the story on the beating of Rodney King by Los Angeles Police Department officers.

Chambers earned several Emmy Awards, Golden Mike Awards, LA City and County Proclamations, an LA Press Club Award, and a star on the Hollywood Walk of Fame. His grandson, Jaime Chambers, became a reporter at KTLA in 2003, and now works at KSWB-TV (Fox-5) in San Diego.

== Retirement years and death ==
Chambers retired on August 11, 2010, on his 87th birthday, marking 63 years as a reporter at KTLA.

He died on February 13, 2015, at his home in the Holmby Hills neighborhood of Los Angeles at the age of 91.

Stan Chambers is interred at Holy Cross Cemetery in Culver City, California, beside his wife Beverly.
