= Tamorot =

- Rural commune and town
- Interactive map of Tamorot
- Coordinates: 34°56′N 4°47′W
- Country: Morocco
- Region: Tanger-Tetouan-Al Hoceima
- Province: Chefchaouen
- Cercle: Bab Berred

Population (2004)
  - Total: 24,541
- Time zone: UTC+0 (GMT)

Tamorot (ⵜⴰⵎⵓⵔⵓⵜ in Tamazight) is a small town and rural commune in Chefchaouen Province, Tanger-Tetouan-Al Hoceima, Morocco. At the time of the 2004 census, the commune had a total population of 24,541 people living in 3581 households.

== Well incident ==
On 1 February 2022, a 5-year-old boy named Rayan, fell into a well of 32 meters deep. On 5 February it was announced Rayan was rescued out of the well, but later it was announced that he had died.
