= Rescue of Jessica McClure =

Saving of a toddler who fell into a well in Texas in 1987

Jessica McClure
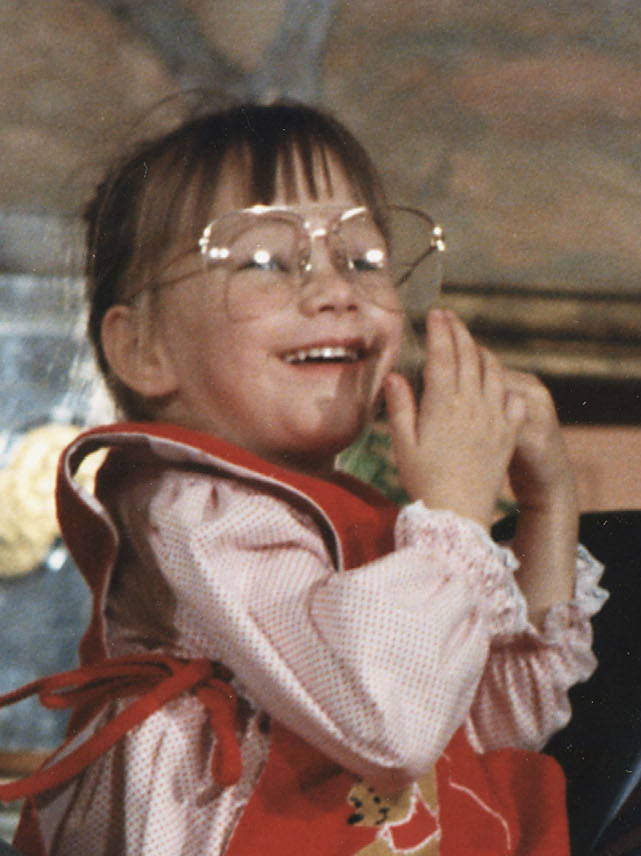
- McClure in 1989
- Born: Jessica McClure; March 26, 1986 (age 40); Midland, Texas, U.S.
- Other name: Jessica McClure Morales
- Known for: Falling into a well at 18 months
- Spouse: Daniel Morales (m. 2006)
- Children: 2

On October 14, 1987, 18-month-old Jessica McClure Morales (born March 26, 1986), who would become known as "Baby Jessica", fell into a well in her aunt's backyard in Midland, Texas. This garnered national attention, with the big three television networks broadcasting McClure's rescue live. In 1989, ABC produced a television movie about the incident, entitled Everybody's Baby: The Rescue of Jessica McClure.

Over the next 58 hours, rescuers worked to free her from the 8 in (20 cm) well casing, about 22 ft (7 m) below grade.

== Rescue ==
The incident occurred in Midland, Texas, where firemen and police developed a plan to drill a parallel shaft to the well where Jessica was lodged—and drill another horizontal cross-tunnel to rescue her. Enlisting the help of local oil drillers, officials hoped to free McClure quickly. But they then discovered that the well was surrounded by rock. The rescuers' jackhammers were also inadequate, as they were designed for downward rather than horizontal drilling.

A mining engineer eventually arrived to help supervise and coordinate the rescue effort, and a relatively new technology, waterjet cutting, was used to cut through the rock.

Forty-five hours after Jessica fell into the well, the adjacent shaft and cross-tunnel were complete. During the drilling, rescuers could hear Jessica singing "Winnie the Pooh".

A roofing contractor, Ron Short, volunteered to go down the shaft. He had been born without collarbones and could collapse his shoulders to work in tight confines. The team considered his offer, but ultimately EMT/paramedic Robert O'Donnell was the one who descended the shaft, inching his way into the tunnel and freeing Jessica from her position inside the well. O'Donnell then returned with Jessica to the parallel shaft, handing her off to fellow EMT Steve Forbes, who carried her up to the surface and to a waiting ambulance.

== Media coverage ==
Each of the Big Three television networks broke into their primetime programming to report McClure's rescue. ABC interrupted the sitcom I Married Dora, with Ted Koppel presiding the coverage, while CBS' Dan Rather cut off an hour episode of Beauty and the Beast (which was resumed in its entirety after the special report). NBC broke into Rags to Riches, with Connie Chung presenting the news coverage.

Then-president Ronald Reagan said that "everybody in America became godmothers and godfathers of Jessica while this was going on."

News of the successful rescue was shared across the nation in real time. In Minnesota, during a football game between the University of Minnesota and the University of Indiana at the Hubert H. Humphrey Metrodome, a message was displayed on the Jumbotron to announce the successful rescue of “Baby Jessica”, to which the crowd began cheering. Minnesota lost the game 17-18.

In 1988, McClure and her parents appeared on Live with Regis and Kathie Lee to talk about the incident.

A photograph of McClure's rescue by Scott Shaw of the Odessa American received the 1988 Pulitzer Prize for Spot News Photography.

ABC made a television movie of the story in 1989, Everybody's Baby: The Rescue of Jessica McClure, starring Beau Bridges and Patty Duke and featuring many participants from the actual rescue as extras.

On May 30, 2007, USA Today ranked McClure number 22 on its list of "25 lives of indelible impact".

== Aftermath ==
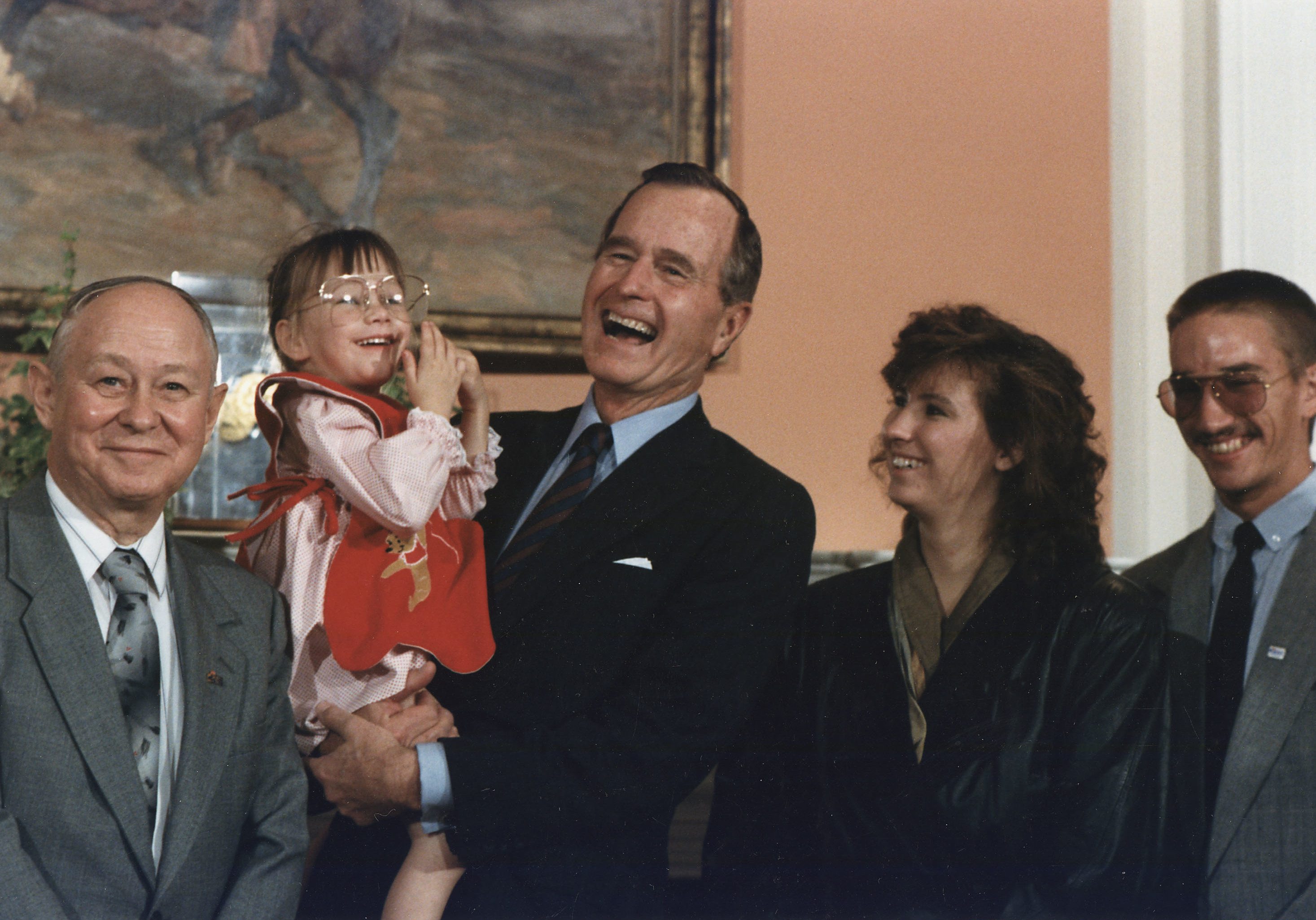
President George H. W. Bush meeting McClure at the White House in 1989

Following McClure's rescue on October 16, 1987, doctors feared they would have to amputate Jessica's foot due to damage from loss of blood flow sustained from her leg being elevated above her head for 58 and a half hours she was stuck in the well. They decided to try hyperbaric therapy in an attempt to avoid full amputation. In the end, surgeons only had to amputate a toe due to gangrene caused by loss of circulation while she was in the well. Jessica carries a scar on her forehead where her head rubbed against the well casing and, despite the incident and 15 subsequent related surgeries, retains no first-hand memory of the events. Her parents divorced in 1990.

Paramedic Robert O'Donnell (August 27, 1957 – April 27, 1995) developed post-traumatic stress disorder after the rescue and later struggled to cope with the rapid fame and subsequent obscurity he experienced in the immediate aftermath of his heroic act. He died from a self-inflicted gunshot wound.

In May 2004, McClure graduated from Greenwood High School, in a small community near Midland. On January 28, 2006, she married Daniel Morales at the Church of Christ in Notrees, Texas, about 40 mi (60 km) from Midland. They met at a day care center where she worked with his sister. They have two children, a son born in 2007 and a daughter born in 2009.

When McClure turned 25 on March 26, 2011, she became the beneficiary of a trust fund comprising approximately $1.2 million in donations made during her infancy. She discussed using the funds for her children's college and to purchase her home, less than 2 mi (3 km) from the well into which she fell. She also indicated the fund lost much of its value during the 2008 financial crisis.

On April 11, 2026, after a domestic disturbance, county sheriff personnel arrested McClure at her Midland County home. She was charged with assault causing bodily injury involving family violence.

== See also ==
- Floyd Collins, a "man trapped in a cave" that received high media attention in 1925
- 2010 Copiapó mining accident, cave-in and miner rescue at a mine in Atacama Region (Chile) where 33 miners were rescued in 2010
- Tham Luang cave rescue, where 12 children and a coach were rescued from a cave in Thailand in 2018
- Kathy Fiscus, a three-year-old American girl who died after falling into a well in 1949
- Alfredo Rampi, a six-year-old Italian boy who died after falling into a well in 1981
- Julen Roselle, a two-year-old Spanish toddler who died after falling into a well in 2019
- Rayan Oram, a five-year-old Moroccan boy who died after falling into a well in 2022
- Tikki Tikki Tembo (1968), a children's book about a Chinese boy who fell into a well
