= Death of Alfredo Rampi =

Italian child who died after falling into a well in 1981

Alfredo Rampi
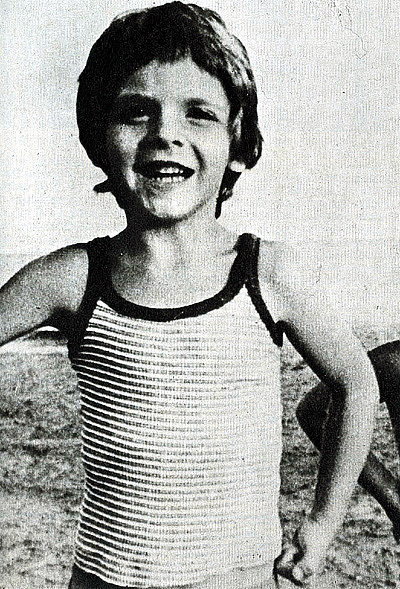
- Alfredino Rampi in 1981
- Born: 11 April 1975; Rome, Italy
- Died: 13 June 1981 (aged 6); Vermicino, Italy
- Resting place: Campo Verano Cemetery, Rome, Italy

Alfredo Rampi (11 April 1975 – 13 June 1981), nicknamed Alfredino (Little Alfredo), was an Italian child who died after falling into a well in Vermicino, a village near Frascati, on 10 June 1981.

== Incident ==
On 10 June 1981, around 19:00, six-year-old Alfredo walked with his family. He asked to return home alone. While wandering, he fell into an artesian well, approximately 30 cm (12 in) wide and 80 m (260 ft) deep. Rescuers estimated his position at 36 m (118 ft) below ground.

Local firefighters attempted to lower a board attached to a rope for Alfredo to grab. The board became stuck, blocking the exit, and the rope tore. Three cave explorers tried descending upside-down to remove the board but failed due to the narrow passage.

Rome fire department commander Elveno Pastorelli ordered digging a parallel shaft 40 m (130 ft) deep with a connecting tunnel to reach Alfredo from below. Heavy machinery broke through hard rock layers, but vibrations caused Alfredo to slip 30 m (98 ft) deeper. The tunnel was 3 m (9.8 ft) from the well. The rescue drew unprecedented media attention. President Sandro Pertini visited the site.

Volunteer Angelo Licheri descended the well, reached Alfredo, and attempted to secure a harness, but failed. Further rescue attempts were unsuccessful, and Alfredo slipped deeper. His voice, relayed by microphone, weakened. He likely died around 6:30 on 13 June 1981. Volunteer Donato Caruso confirmed his death while attempting to secure a harness. The body was recovered on 11 July.

Alfredo's mother, Franca Rampi, founded the Rampi Centre to improve emergency rescue coordination.

== Media coverage ==
RAI broadcast live for 18 hours, attracting as many as 21 million viewers. The rescue attempt marked Italy’s first live broadcast of such an event. Initially expecting a quick resolution, broadcasts continued as the situation worsened, sparking debate about privacy and broadcasting ethics. The story gained international attention, leading BBC headlines on 12 June.

== Circumstances of the accident ==
An autopsy revealed Alfredo wore a harness. Volunteer Angelo Licheri claimed he placed it on Alfredo during the rescue. The fire brigade disputed this, citing the well’s narrowness. The judge speculated Alfredo might have been lowered into the well, but investigations reached no verdict.

== Legacy ==
Italian alternative rock band Baustelle released a song, "Alfredo," on their 2008 album Amen, track 10. The album won the 2008 "Targa Tenco," a prestigious Italian music award.

== See also ==
- Floyd Collins († 1925)
- Kathy Fiscus († 1949)
- Jessica McClure (1987, survived)
- Julen Roselló († 2019)
- Rayan Aourram († 2022)
