= Death of Rayan Aourram =

2022 death of five-year old Moroccan boy

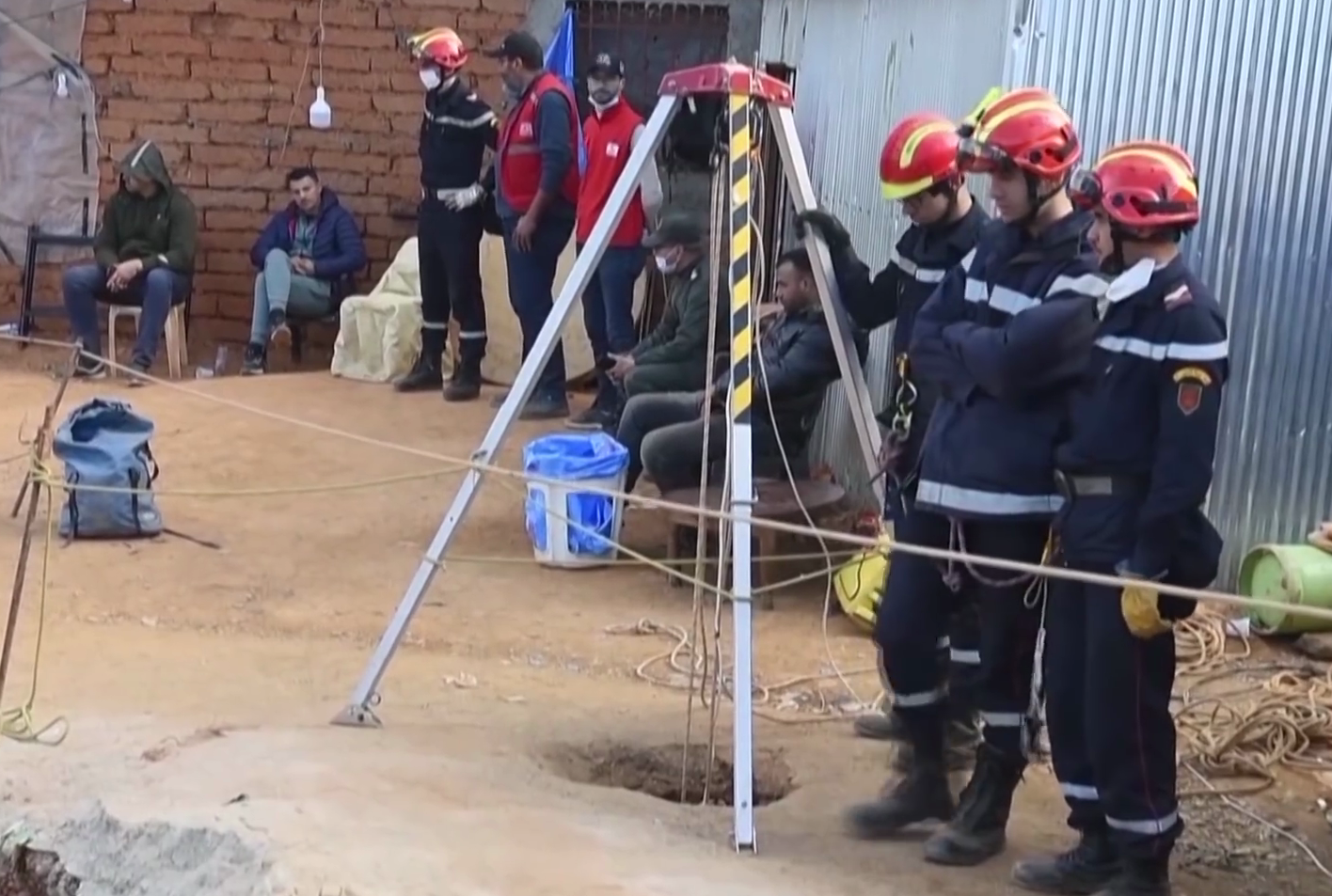
- Rescuers inspect the well that Aourram fell in
- Location: Ighran village, Tamorot commune, Chefchaouen Province, Morocco
- Outcome: Aourram's death

On 1 February 2022, five-year-old Moroccan boy Rayan Aourram (Berber languages: ⵕⴰⵢⴰⵏ ⴰⵡⵕⴰⵎ; Arabic: ريان أورام) fell into a 32-metre (105 ft) dry well in Ighran village in Tamorot commune, Chefchaouen Province, Morocco.

Rescue attempts were delayed by the narrow well and fragile ground. A separate trench was dug to access the bottom of the well, although when rescuers reached Aourram on 5 February it was discovered that he had died.

== Background ==
The mountainous region where the accident took place is located in the vicinity of Chefchaouen, in the Rif region of Northern Morocco, a region known for cannabis cultivation, which constitutes a main income resource for many poor families. This plant requires copious amounts of water to grow, especially the imported hybrid varieties, as opposed to the local kif hashish, whose cultivation can rely solely on rainwater. This is why locals dig deep wells, which need to be deep enough to reach the progressively drying underground waters. These wells are usually covered to prevent falling accidents.

Because of the high demand for water and the advancing drought, which was one of the indirect causes of the Hirak Rif Movement in 2016, the locals have to dig deeper and deeper to tap into underground waters. Morocco is not the only country that has these issues, but other countries such as Spain suffer from the consequences of drought too, and have more than half a million illegally dug wells, according to some estimates. Such falling accidents have also occurred in recent years in countries like Spain, Algeria, Poland and Germany.

== Timeline ==
While playing outside on 1 February 2022, five-year-old Rayan Aourram fell into a dry well in the village of Ighran in Chefchaouen Province, Morocco. Aourram's father was working nearby, and had been repairing the well. His family saw small footprints near the well, and heard his voice. By use of a flashlight and a phone camera they sent down, the family confirmed Aourram was within the well and informed the local authorities. Traditional methods of rescue failed, so provincial authorities of Chefchaouen were informed.

The following day, volunteers tried to reach Aourram by going down the 32-metre (105 ft) well. The well is 45 centimetres (18 in) wide at the top and gets narrower as it goes down, so direct rescue was impossible. Despite this, it was confirmed that Aourram was still alive. Authorities brought heavy machinery, including bulldozers, and started digging a trench at the side of the well. Water, food and oxygen were lowered, as well as a camera to monitor the boy's condition.

On 3 February, a camera was lowered into the well and it was determined that while Aourram was suffering minor head injuries, he was conscious. The rescue team continued digging on the side of the well; the plan was to dig vertically to the same level as Aourram, and then dig horizontally. They dug carefully, stopping at times to ensure safety and avoid a cave-in. A medical team, including an ambulance and a helicopter of the Royal Moroccan Gendarmerie, were dispatched to the scene. Diggers reached Aourram's level on 4 February, and began the more delicate task of digging horizontally with hand tools and techniques to avoid vibrating the surrounding soil. On 5 February, the fourth day since Aourram's fall, a rock blocking the tunnel caused a three-hour delay to the rescue attempt. Large pipes were put in place to secure the tunnel. A chief rescuer said it was not possible to determine Aourram's condition, and officials were unsure if he was still alive.

When rescuers reached Aourram that day, they discovered that he had died; a royal palace statement made soon after his extraction announced his death, and said that King Mohammed VI had called Aourram's parents to give his condolences. Following his death, many politicians and celebrities sent their condolences.

== Media coverage ==
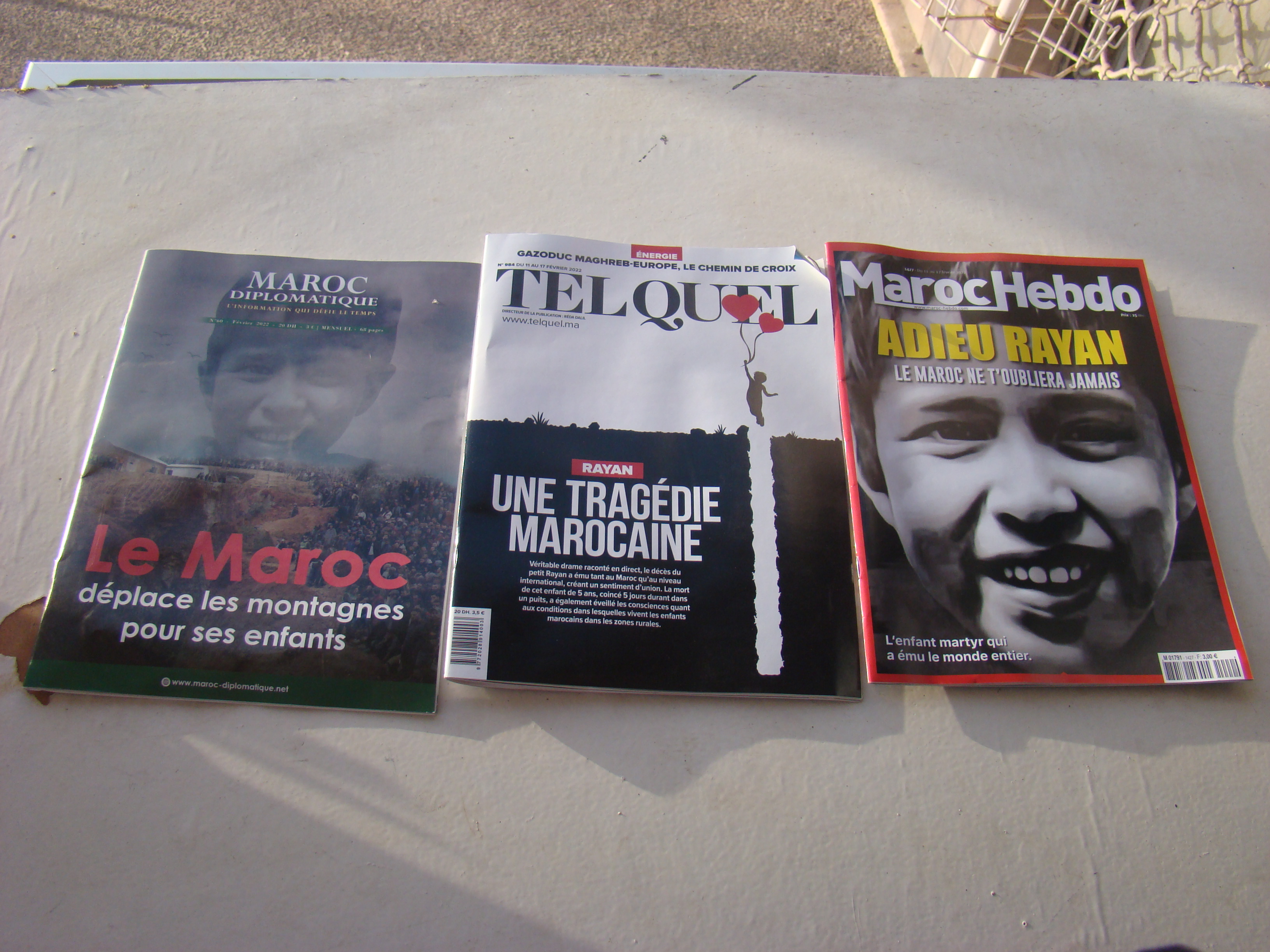
Magazines covering the incident

The accident attained wide media coverage in both North African and international media.

Several news outlets praised the response and support from the Algerian people, "despite current political tensions between Morocco and Algeria".

Hashtags including #SaveRayan and its Arabic equivalent (#أنقذوا_ريان) became trending in Morocco, Algeria, and France, where a large North African diaspora lives. The news soon spread to neighbouring Arab countries and was relayed on most Arab national channels.

A parallel was drawn with the death of Julen Roselló, a two-year old Spanish boy who died when he fell into and became trapped in a 100-metre (330 ft) well in 2019.

== Funeral ==
On 7 February 2022, a funeral took place for Aourram, which was attended by many.

== See also ==
- Kathy Fiscus (1945–1949), American child who fell into a well and died
- Alfredo Rampi (1975–1981; nicknamed Alfredino), Italian child who fell into a well and died
- Jessica McClure (born 1986; nicknamed Baby Jessica), American child who fell into a well in 1987 and was rescued
