= Everybody's Baby: The Rescue of Jessica McClure =

1989 dramatic television film

- Genre: Drama
- Written by: David Eyre, Jr.
- Directed by: Mel Damski
- Starring: Beau Bridges; Pat Hingle; Patty Duke
- Music by: Mark Snow
- Country of origin: United States
- Original language: English

Production
- Executive producer: Patricia Clifford
- Producer: Diana Kerew
- Cinematography: Shelly Johnson
- Editor: Ron Binkowski
- Running time: 100 min.
- Production companies: Campbell's; Dick Berg-Stonehenge Productions; Interscope Productions; Stonehenge Entertainment

Original release
- Network: ABC
- Release: May 21, 1989

Everybody's Baby: The Rescue of Jessica McClure is a 1989 dramatic television film for ABC. It is based on the true story of the rescue of 18-month-old Jessica McClure who fell into an abandoned water well while playing in her aunt's backyard. It featured, as extras, many participants in the actual rescue and its coverage.

== Plot ==
Jessica McClure is at her aunt's house Midland, Texas, where her mother, Cissy, is babysitting several young children. While the children play in the large backyard, Cissy steps inside to answer a phone call, momentarily leaving them unattended. When she returns, she realizes Jessica is missing. Assuming she might be playing hide-and-seek, Cissy asks the other children where Jessica went. They point to a narrow pipe, the opening of an abandoned well. Panicked, Cissy listens and barely hears Jessica's faint voice from deep inside.

The first officers on the scene, Andy Glasscock and Manny Beltran, are stunned by how Jessica ended up in the pipe but are initially unsure how to rescue her. Soon, dozens of emergency service workers, reporters, and onlookers converge on the backyard. An earth-mover is brought in to excavate around the pipe, but the vibrations cause Jessica to slip even deeper. Police Chief Richard Czech and Fire Chief James Roberts then develop a plan to dig a parallel shaft and tunnel across to reach and rescue Jessica. The shaft needs to be 28 feet (8.5 m) deep, with nearly all of it cutting through solid rock. Progress stalls when the rescuers encounter the tough rock, requiring a diamond-tipped drill bit to continue. To tunnel across to the abandoned well, rescuers are offered a high-speed water drill for free, including costs to transport.

When the rescuers finally reach Jessica, paramedic Robert O'Donnell is tasked with retrieving her. However, the narrow space and his own claustrophobia force him to retreat without her. Overcoming his fears, O'Donnell returns to the shaft, guided by a doctor's instructions that it’s acceptable to break bones if necessary to pull her free, as long as her neck, back, and head remain unharmed. After spending over 58 hours trapped in the well, Jessica is eventually rescued.

== Cast ==
- Beau Bridges – Police Chief Richard Czech
- Pat Hingle – Fire Chief James Roberts
- Roxana Zal – Cissy McClure
- Will Oldham – Chip McClure
- Whip Hubley – Robert O'Donnell
- Robin Gammell – MSHA Investigator Thomas Kaye
- Walter Olkewicz – Police Officer Andy Glasscock
- Rudy Ramos – Police Officer Manny Beltran
- Jack Rader – Public Information Officer James White
- Guy Stockwell – Bill Jones
- Daryl Anderson – Richard Armstrong
- Mills Watson – Charles Boler
- Patty Duke – Carolyn Henry
- Rodney Wunsch – Himself (reporter)
- Laura and Jennifer Loesch – Jessica McClure

== Production ==
=== Development ===
In March 1988, several months after the rescue, a dispute arose between two groups competing to create a television drama about the event. A five-person citizen's committee was appointed to evaluate the proposals and decide which one would be developed. Co-executive producer John Kander secured the rights after submitting his proposal six months post-rescue, once media attention had waned. He commented that the media exaggerated the dispute between production companies and noted that he was the first producer the McClures chose to speak with.

=== Casting ===
Roxana Zal, cast as Cissy McClure, expressed enthusiasm for the project after reading the script. Although she didn’t meet the real Cissy McClure until after filming, they frequently spoke on the phone during production. To prepare for the role, Zal watched news footage of the rescue and consulted with mothers of young children, including her own. She noted that her entire family had watched the actual rescue unfold.

Rodney Wunsch portrayed himself, a 23-year-old reporter during the rescue, who stayed on scene for 35 hours, providing live updates every hour. The movie marked his professional acting debut, after securing the role following three auditions. Wunsch found re-enacting the scenes emotionally challenging, though not as difficult as the original coverage. A scene in the movie shows him breaking down and being told to go home, but in reality, he maintained composed during his 35-hours on air, only returning home for a few hours to sleep. Speaking in 1989, Wunsch believed that the movie's portrayal of the rescue was accurate, noting that producers were committed to ensuring that the movie was true to real life events.

=== Filming ===
Filming reportedly started around March 1989, in the back yard of a house in Los Angeles. Although it is supposed to be set in Midland, Texas, almost all filming took place in Bellflower, California, with just a handful of scenes shot in Midland, including the hospital and city hall. The well shaft was recreated on a sound stage at Culver Studios. Although Jessica was portrayed by twins in the drama, she was represented by a lifelike doll for scenes within the well. Many of those involved in the television movie also helped in the rescue. Twenty of the real people portrayed in the movie were each paid an equal sum of money.

To keep the number of characters manageable, some of the rescuers were combined into composite characters, as approximately 200 people had been involved at the scene.

== Reception ==
Everybody's Baby was the highest-rated network prime-time television program for the week ending May 21, 1989 with a 2.2.9 Nielsen rating and 36 share.

As of August 2024, the movie had an audience approval rating of 64% on Rotten Tomatoes. In the days following the original broadcast, Chip McClure remarked that his portrayal by actor Will Oldham felt inaccurate, believing that the actor appeared scruffier than he did during the ordeal and said he should have played himself.

In a contemporary review, The Washington Post television critic Tom Shales praised the film’s dramatization of the rescue and Beau Bridges’ performance as police chief Richard Czech.
