= Totalán =

- Municipality
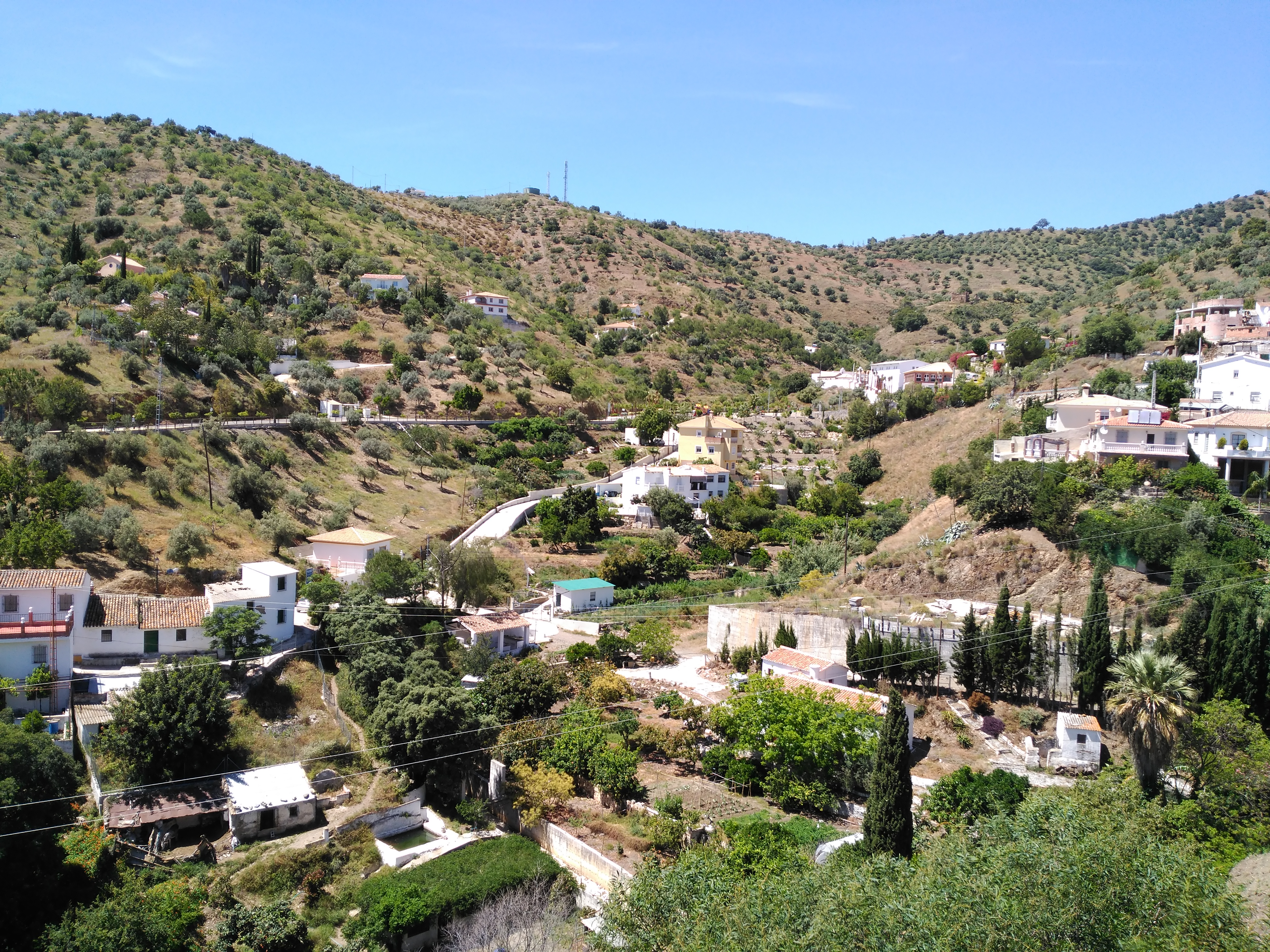

- Flag Coat of arms

- Location of Totalán

- Location in Spain
- Coordinates: 36.767°N 4.283°W
- Sovereign state: Spain
- Autonomous community: Andalusia
- Province: Málaga
- Judicial district: Málaga

Government
  - Alcalde: Miguel Ángel Escaño López (2007) (PSOE)

Area
  - Total: 9.21 km^{2} (3.56 sq mi)
- Elevation: 290 m (950 ft)

Population (2025-01-01)
  - Total: 797
  - Density: 86.5/km^{2} (224/sq mi)
- Demonym(s): Totalatense, Totalateño, -ña or Rebotao, -á
- Postal code: 29197
- Website: Official website

Totalán is a village and municipality in the province of Málaga, part of the autonomous community of Andalusia in southern Spain. It is located in the comarca of La Axarquía. The municipality is situated approximately 22 kilometres from the provincial capital of Málaga and 13 from Rincón de la Victoria. It has a population of approximately 650 residents. The natives are called Totalanenses or Totalaneños and the nickname is Rebotaos.

== Borehole accident ==
On 13 January 2019, a child dropped into a drilled shaft near Totalán and was only recovered 13 days later lifeless.

== See also ==
- List of municipalities in Málaga
