= William Burke Miller =

American journalist (1904–1983)

William Burke "Skeets" Miller (April 14, 1904 – December 29, 1983) was a newspaper and radio reporter.

== Early life ==
According to census documents, William Burke Miller was born in Louisville, Kentucky. He was the son of Charles J. (an assistant manager at a furniture store) and Julia Miller. They also had another child, a daughter named Mary. Little is known about Miller's childhood, although several sources have noted he had originally dreamed of being a professional singer.

== Journalism career ==
Miller was a cub reporter for The Courier-Journal in Louisville, making $25 a week ("Two Men," 33), and his newspaper sent him to cover the story of Floyd Collins, a 37-year-old man who had been trapped in a cave, his leg pinned by a 26-pound rock. As the story unfolded, Miller was able to report from the scene and make contact with Collins: Miller was very slight – 5 feet 5 inches (1.65 m) and 117 pounds (53 kg) – enabling him to squeeze into a part of the cave where he could talk to Collins, pray with him, and bring him food, as rescuers engaged in an effort to free him. Each day, Miller filed his stories, in the first person; wire services picked up the story and soon a national audience was waiting and hoping for Collins to be set free. The rescue proved more difficult than originally expected, and by the time Collins was reached fifteen days later, he was found dead.

Miller's reporting earned him a Pulitzer Prize on May 4, 1926; his newspaper also gave him a $1000 prize. He left the profession, moved to Winter Haven, Florida, and went into retail, working for an ice cream manufacturer ("Prize Reporter," 9). He was offered a job at the New York Morning World, and moved to New York, along with his sister. His new employer did not like his writing, and Miller decided to leave journalism and enter broadcasting.

== Radio career ==
Miller was hired by the National Broadcasting Company sometime in 1927, as the assistant chief press agent, working in the publicity department at the network. By 1930, he had been promoted, as NBC created a new department, special events programming; his job was to supervise all current events broadcasts, and also help with special news programs. This meant coordinating all on-location remotes—such as when NBC attempted a broadcast from a submarine in New London, Connecticut, in late 1930. Miller supervised the team that set up the special microphones and made sure the announcer would be in position to describe this unique event. Throughout the 1930s, whenever an unusual event required staff to be on location, it was often Miller who made sure things went smoothly. By the early 1940s, he was also supervising public service broadcasts. Due to Miller's creative on-the-spot coverage (including the first live transmission from a parachute jump) Robert Ripley designated him "the bravest man in radio."

On September 26, 1938, Miller married radio and stage actress Alice Reinheart, but their marriage ended in divorce. In the late 1940s, Miller remarried, to children's show host and producer Madge Tucker.

== Later years ==
When television came along, Miller was among the many NBC personnel who began to work in both the radio and the television operations. He had already done some work with NBC's experimental TV station, where by some accounts, he arranged the first televised sports broadcast, a college baseball game between Columbia and Princeton. By 1947, he had officially joined NBC-TV, as one of the network's program editors. Miller continued to cover news and special programming for NBC TV and Radio.

In 1954, he returned to the Mammoth Cave National Park area with a group of 32 people (journalists, scientists, and explorers) who were eager to study the famous Crystal Cave that Collins had originally discovered in 1917. They entered it, and spent an entire week exploring; Miller told an Associated Press reporter the Crystal Cave, with its "flower-like formations of gypsum" was like an "orchid paradise" and despite its role in the tragedy of Collins' death, it was still a place of amazing natural beauty. Afterwards, Miller retired from NBC, where his final position was as night editor for the network.

He and his wife moved to South Wallingford, Vermont. Miller still did some freelance writing for the local newspaper. He died in Sebastian, Florida, in December 1983, after a period of failing health; he was 79.
