= Vermicino =

- Frazione
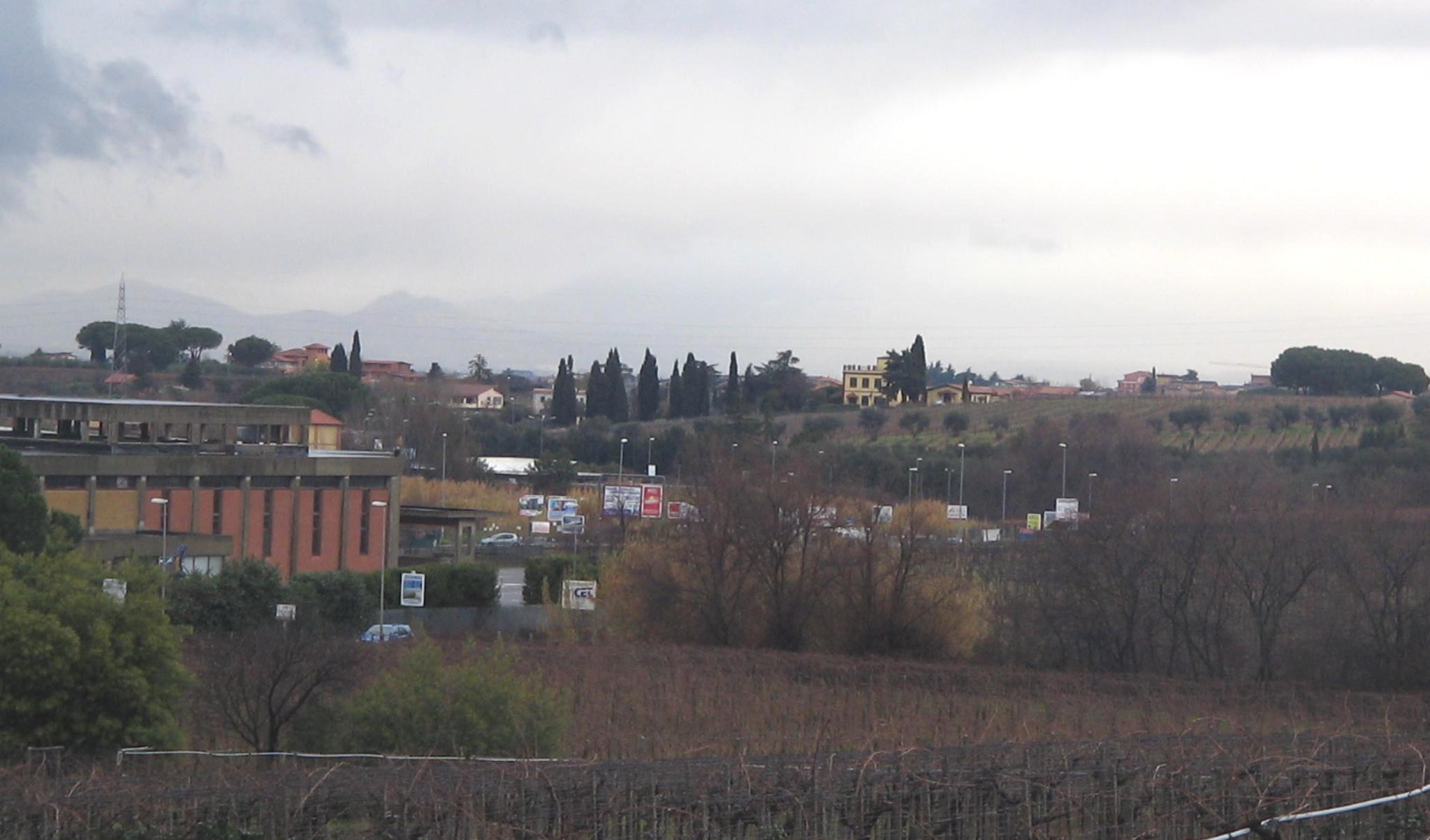
- Northern rural area and Via di Vermicino to Selvotta

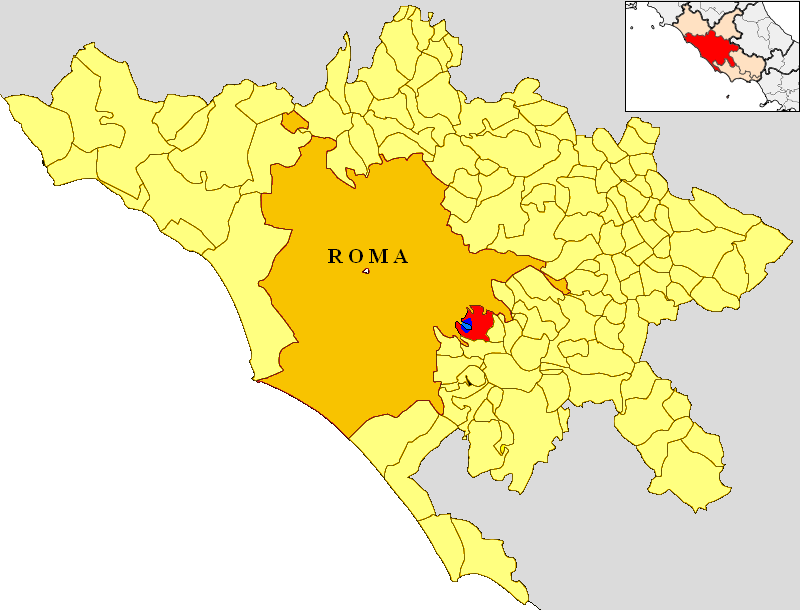
- Vermicino (blue spot) within the municipalities of Frascati (red), Rome (orange) and the province

- Location of Vermicino in Italy
- Coordinates: 41°49′25″N 12°38′33″E
- Country: Italy
- Region: Lazio
- Province: Rome (RM)
- Comune: Frascati
- Elevation: 127 m (417 ft)
- Demonym: Vermigli
- Time zone: UTC+1 (CET)
  - Summer (DST): UTC+2 (CEST)
- Postal code: 00044
- Dialing code: 06

Vermicino is a village and civil parish (frazione) of the Italian municipality of Frascati, in the Province of Rome, Lazio. In Italian language its name means "little worm", in an unused form.

== Geography ==
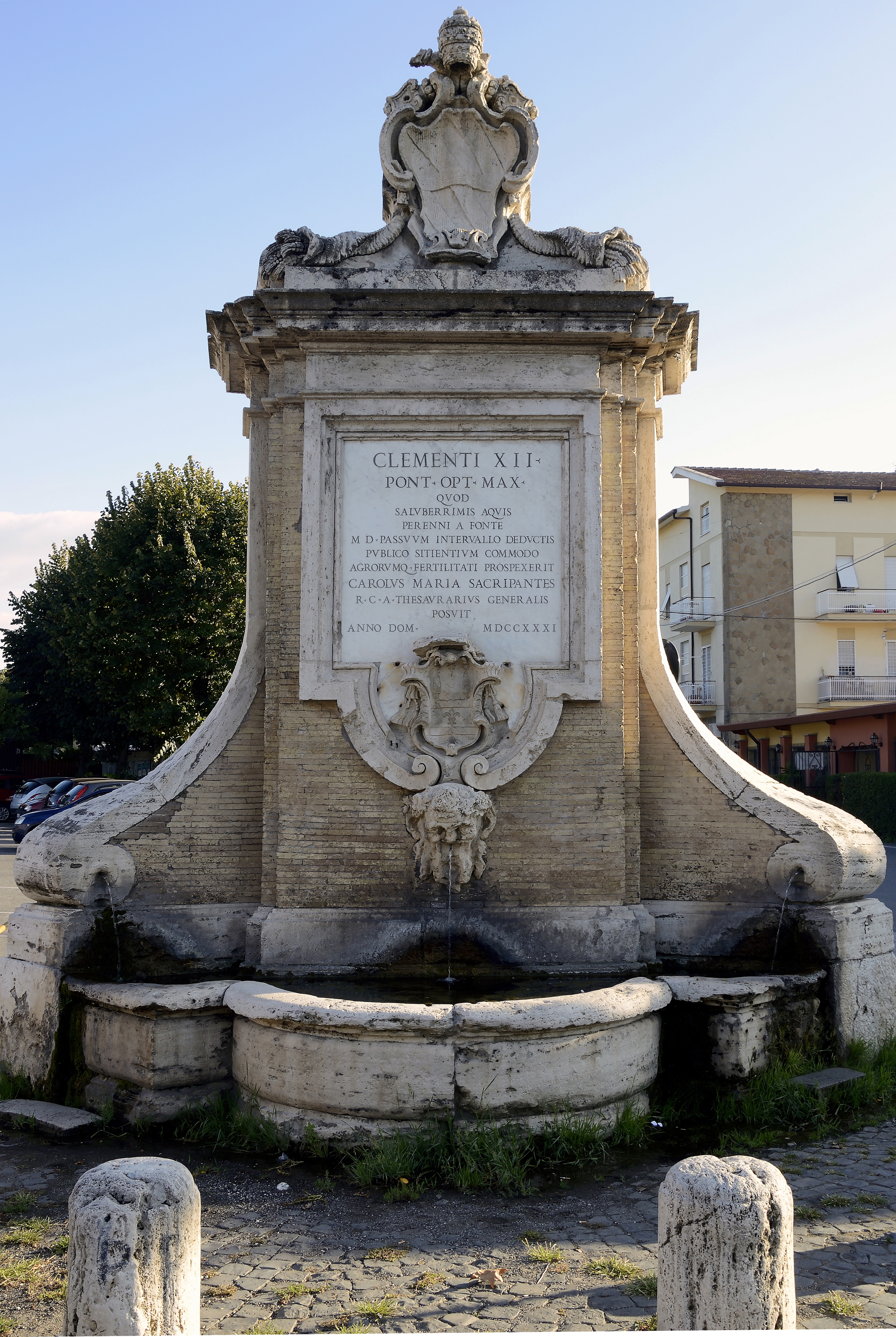
Vanvitelli's fountain

Located near Ciampino (4 km away) and Morena (2 km away), close to the south-eastern suburb of Rome; Vermicino, as frazione of Frascati, is part of the Castelli Romani. A minor part of its territory, a strip in the central area, belongs to the municipality of Rome as part of the Zone XVII "Torre Gaia". In the north of the village there is a locality, mainly composed by some scattered houses, named Selvotta, considered part of Vermicino.

The main road crossing Vermicino is the historical one of Tuscolana, linking Rome (20 km away) and Frascati (2.5 km away). Other main roads are Via di Vermicino (in which is located Selvotta) and Via di Passolombardo, that links the village to the motorway's exit of "Roma Torrenova", on the "South Rome Branch" of the A1.

The village is also 4.5 km away from Rome Ciampino Airport, 5 from Grottaferrata and circa 3 from the Roman suburban villages of Borghesiana and Finocchio. The nearest railway stations are Tor Vergata (near Frascati), Ciampino, and Frascati.

== History ==
=== Origins ===
Vermicino owes its name to an event that took place in 1183, when the troops of Archbishop Cristiano of Mainz came to the rescue of the Counts of Tusculum, besieged by the Romans. The archbishop's troops died after drinking the water from the source poisoned by the besiegers, according to this version "vermicina" would therefore be poisonous.

=== Overview ===
In the middle of the original village there is a fountain, built in 1731 by the order of the Pope Clement XII and designed by Luigi Vanvitelli. From the 1970s Vermicino grew as part of the urban expansion in southern Roman surroundings.

=== Alfredo Rampi's incident ===
On June 10, 1981, a 6-year-old child, Alfredo Rampi, fell into an artesian well located in a rural field in Selvotta, and died on June 13. Originally a local item of news, the attempted rescue became a national media event from June 12, due to an 18-hours-long live broadcast by the main TV channels of RAI, unified for the event. The broadcast had attracted millions of Italian people to follow the events, and also Vermicino was crowded by a multitude of people. Also the Italian President of that period, Sandro Pertini, came to Vermicino. The media emphasis to that event connected, in Italy, the name of the semi-unknown Vermicino to the tragedy of Rampi's family.

== See also ==
- Castelli Romani
- Rome metropolitan area
