= February 1 =

February 1 this year in various calendars
- Sunday, 1 February 2026
Other calendars
Akan	Kurukwasi
Armenian	16 Mehekani 1475
Aztec	Etzalcualiztli 2, 10 Itzcuintli
Babylonian	12 Tebetu, 2336 SE
Balinese pawukon	Luang, Pepet, Pasah, Laba, Wage, Paniron, Redite of Uye, Indra, Dangu, Raksasa
Bengali	18 Magh, BS 1432
Chinese	Yang Fire Horse・Star Mansion; 14 Làyuè, Yǐsìnián (Dahan, 3 days until Lichun)
Common Era	1 February 2026 CE
Coptic	24 Tobi, AM 1742
Egyptian	21 Payni, 2774 NE
Ethiopian	24 Ṭer, 2018 Amätä Məhrät
French Republican	Décade II, Tridi de Pluviôse de l'Année 234 de la République
Gregorian	1 February, AD 2026
Hebrew	14 Shevat, AM 5786
Hindu	Puṣya・Prīti; Solar: 19 Māgha, 1947 SE; Lunisolar: Pūrṇimā, Śukla pakṣa of Māgha, 2082 VE; Siddhārthin・5126 KY・1,872,607
Icelandic	Sunnudagur, 10 Þorri 2025
Islamic	13 Sha'aban, AH 1447 (using tabular method)
ISO week date	2026-W05-7
Japanese	14 Shiwasu, Reiwa 8 (Daikan, 3 days until Risshun)
Julian	19 January, AD 2026 (AM 7534)
Julian day	2461073
Maya	13.0.13.5.10; 8 Pax, 10 Oc
Roman	ante diem XIV Kalendas Februarias, MMDCCLXXIX AUC
Solar Hijri	12 Bahman, SH 1404
Tibetan	15 rgyal, shing mo sbrul 2152 or 1771 or 999

<<	February					>>
Su	Mo	Tu	We	Th	Fr	Sa
1	2	3	4	5	6	7
8	9	10	11	12	13	14
15	16	17	18	19	20	21
22	23	24	25	26	27	28
2026

February 1 in recent years
2026 (Sunday)
2025 (Saturday)
2024 (Thursday)
2023 (Wednesday)
2022 (Tuesday)
2021 (Monday)
2020 (Saturday)
2019 (Friday)
2018 (Thursday)
2017 (Wednesday)

February 1 is the 32nd day of the year in the Gregorian calendar; 333 days remain until the end of the year (334 in leap years).

== Events ==
=== Pre-1600 ===
- 1327 – The teenaged Edward III is crowned King of England, but the country is ruled by his mother Queen Isabella and her lover Roger Mortimer.
- 1411 – The First Peace of Thorn is signed in Thorn (Toruń), Monastic State of the Teutonic Knights (Prussia).

=== 1601–1900 ===
- 1662 – The Chinese general Koxinga seizes the island of Taiwan after a nine-month siege.
- 1713 – The Kalabalik or Skirmish at Bender results from the Ottoman Sultan Ahmed III's order that his unwelcome guest, King Charles XII of Sweden, be seized.
- 1793 – French Revolutionary Wars: France declares war on the United Kingdom and the Netherlands.
- 1796 – The capital of Upper Canada is moved from Newark to York.
- 1814 – Mayon in the Philippines erupts, killing around 1,200 people, which was the most devastating eruption of the volcano.
- 1835 – Slavery is abolished in Mauritius.
- 1861 – American Civil War: Texas secedes from the United States and joins the Confederacy a week later.
- 1864 – Second Schleswig War: Prussian forces crossed the border into Schleswig, starting the war.
- 1865 – President Abraham Lincoln signs the Thirteenth Amendment to the United States Constitution.
- 1884 – The first volume (A to Ant) of the Oxford English Dictionary is published.
- 1893 – Thomas A. Edison finishes construction of the first motion picture studio, the Black Maria in West Orange, New Jersey.
- 1895 – Fountains Valley, Pretoria, the oldest nature reserve in Africa, is proclaimed by President Paul Kruger.
- 1896 – La bohème premieres in Turin at the Teatro Regio (Turin), conducted by the young Arturo Toscanini.
- 1897 – Shinhan Bank, the oldest bank in South Korea, opens in Seoul.
- 1900 – Great Britain, defeated by Boers in key battles, names Lord Roberts commander of British forces in South Africa.

=== 1901–present ===
- 1908 – Lisbon Regicide: King Carlos I of Portugal and Infante Luis Filipe are shot dead in Lisbon.
- 1924 – Russia–United Kingdom relations are restored, over six years after the Communist revolution.
- 1942 – World War II: Josef Terboven, Reichskommissar of German-occupied Norway, appoints Vidkun Quisling the Minister President of the National Government.
- 1942 – World War II: U.S. Navy conducts Marshalls–Gilberts raids, the first offensive action by the United States against Japanese forces in the Pacific Theater.
- 1942 – Voice of America, the official external radio and television service of the United States government, begins broadcasting with programs aimed at areas controlled by the Axis powers.
- 1942 – Mao Zedong makes a speech on "Reform in Learning, the Party and Literature", which puts into motion the Yan'an Rectification Movement.
- 1946 – Trygve Lie of Norway is picked to be the first United Nations Secretary-General.
- 1946 – The Parliament of Hungary abolishes the monarchy after nine centuries, and proclaims the Hungarian Republic.
- 1950 – The first prototype of the MiG-17 makes its maiden flight.
- 1957 – Northeast Airlines Flight 823 crashes on Rikers Island in New York City, killing 20 people and injuring 78 others.
- 1960 – Four black students stage the first of the Greensboro sit-ins at a lunch counter in Greensboro, North Carolina.
- 1964 – The Beatles have their first number one hit in the United States with "I Want to Hold Your Hand".
- 1968 – Vietnam War: The execution of Viet Cong officer Nguyễn Văn Lém by South Vietnamese National Police Chief Nguyễn Ngọc Loan is recorded on motion picture film, as well as in an iconic still photograph taken by Eddie Adams.
- 1968 – Canada's three military services, the Royal Canadian Navy, the Canadian Army and the Royal Canadian Air Force, are unified into the Canadian Forces.
- 1968 – The New York Central Railroad and the Pennsylvania Railroad are merged to form Penn Central Transportation.
- 1972 – Kuala Lumpur becomes a city by a royal charter granted by the Yang di-Pertuan Agong of Malaysia.
- 1974 – A fire in the 25-story Joelma Building in São Paulo, Brazil kills 189 and injures 293.
- 1979 – Iranian Ayatollah Ruhollah Khomeini returns to Tehran after nearly 15 years of exile.
- 1981 – The Underarm bowling incident of 1981 occurred when Trevor Chappell bowls underarm on the final delivery of a game between Australia and New Zealand at the Melbourne Cricket Ground (MCG).
- 1982 – The Intel 80286 is released, which introduced protected mode memory. The IBM PC/AT and its clones used this CPU.
- 1991 – A runway collision between USAir Flight 1493 and SkyWest Flight 5569 at Los Angeles International Airport results in the deaths of 34 people, and injuries to 30 others.
- 1991 – A magnitude 6.8 earthquake strikes the Hindu Kush region, killing at least 848 people in Afghanistan, Pakistan and present-day Tajikistan.
- 1992 – The Chief Judicial Magistrate of Bhopal court declares Warren Anderson, ex-CEO of Union Carbide, a fugitive under Indian law for failing to appear in the Bhopal disaster case.
- 1996 – The Communications Decency Act is passed by the U.S. Congress.
- 1998 – Rear Admiral Lillian E. Fishburne becomes the first female African American to be promoted to rear admiral.
- 2002 – Daniel Pearl, American journalist and South Asia Bureau Chief of The Wall Street Journal, kidnapped on January 23, is beheaded and mutilated by his captors.
- 2003 – Space Shuttle Columbia disintegrated during the reentry of mission STS-107 into the Earth's atmosphere, killing all seven astronauts aboard.
- 2004 – Hajj pilgrimage stampede: In a stampede at the Hajj pilgrimage in Saudi Arabia, 251 people are trampled to death and 244 injured.
- 2004 – Double suicide attack in Erbil on the offices of Iraqi Kurdish political parties by members of Jama'at al-Tawhid wal-Jihad
- 2005 – King Gyanendra of Nepal carries out a coup d'état to capture the democracy, becoming Chairman of the Councils of ministers.
- 2007 – The National Weather Service in the United States switches from the Fujita scale to the new Enhanced Fujita scale to measure the intensity and strength of tornadoes.
- 2009 – The first cabinet of Jóhanna Sigurðardóttir was formed in Iceland, making her the country's first female prime minister and the world's first openly gay head of government.
- 2012 – Seventy-four people are killed and over 500 injured as a result of clashes between fans of Egyptian football teams Al Masry and Al Ahly in the city of Port Said.
- 2013 – The Shard, the sixth-tallest building in Europe, opens its viewing gallery to the public.
- 2021 – A coup d'état in Myanmar removes Aung San Suu Kyi from power and restores military rule.
- 2022 – Five-year-old Moroccan boy Rayan Aourram falls into a 32-meter (105 feet) deep well in Ighran village in Tamorot commune, Chefchaouen Province, Morocco, but dies four days later, before rescue workers reached him.

== Births ==
=== Pre-1600 ===
- 1261 – Walter de Stapledon, English bishop and politician, Lord High Treasurer (died 1326)
- 1435 – Amadeus IX, Duke of Savoy (died 1472)
- 1447 – Eberhard II, Duke of Württemberg (died 1504)
- 1459 – Conrad Celtes, German poet and scholar (died 1508)
- 1462 – Johannes Trithemius, German lexicographer, historian, and cryptographer (died 1516)
- 1552 – Edward Coke, English lawyer, judge, and politician, Attorney General for England and Wales (died 1634)
- 1561 – Henry Briggs, British mathematician (died 1630)

=== 1601–1900 ===
- 1635 – Marquard Gude, German archaeologist and scholar (died 1689)
- 1648 – Elkanah Settle, English poet and playwright (died 1724)
- 1659 – Jacob Roggeveen, Dutch explorer (died 1729)
- 1663 – Ignacia del Espíritu Santo, Filipino nun, founded the Religious of the Virgin Mary (died 1748)
- 1666 – Marie Thérèse de Bourbon, Princess of Conti and titular queen of Poland (died 1732)
- 1687 – Johann Adam Birkenstock, German violinist and composer (died 1733)
- 1690 – Francesco Maria Veracini, Italian violinist and composer (died 1768)
- 1701 – Johan Agrell, Swedish-German pianist and composer (died 1765)
- 1761 – Christiaan Hendrik Persoon, South African-French mycologist and academic (died 1836)
- 1763 – Thomas Campbell, Irish minister and theologian (died 1854)
- 1796 – Abraham Emanuel Fröhlich, Swiss minister, poet, and educator (died 1865)
- 1801 – Émile Littré, French lexicographer and philosopher (died 1881)
- 1820 – George Hendric Houghton, American clergyman and theologian (died 1897)
- 1836 – Emil Hartmann, Danish organist and composer (died 1898)
- 1844 – G. Stanley Hall, American psychologist and academic (died 1924)
- 1851 – Durham Stevens, American lawyer and diplomat (died 1908)
- 1858 – Ignacio Bonillas, Mexican diplomat (died 1942)
- 1859 – Victor Herbert, Irish-American cellist, composer, and conductor (died 1924)
- 1866 – Agda Meyerson, Swedish nurse and healthcare activist (died 1924)
- 1868 – Ștefan Luchian, Romanian painter and illustrator (died 1917)
- 1870 – Erik Adolf von Willebrand, Finnish physician (died 1949)
- 1872 – Clara Butt, English opera singer (died 1936)
- 1872 – Jerome F. Donovan, American lawyer and politician (died 1949)
- 1873 – John Barry, Irish soldier, Victoria Cross recipient (died 1901)
- 1874 – Hugo von Hofmannsthal, Austrian author, poet, and playwright (died 1929)
- 1878 – Alfréd Hajós, Hungarian swimmer and architect, designed the Grand Hotel Aranybika (died 1955)
- 1878 – Milan Hodža, Slovak journalist and politician, 10th Prime Minister of Czechoslovakia (died 1944)
- 1881 – Tip Snooke, South African cricketer (died 1966)
- 1882 – Vladimir Dimitrov, Bulgarian artist (died 1960)
- 1882 – Louis St. Laurent, Canadian lawyer and politician, 12th Prime Minister of Canada (died 1973)
- 1884 – Yevgeny Zamyatin, Russian journalist and author (died 1937)
- 1884 – Candy Jim Taylor, American baseball player (died 1948)
- 1887 – Charles Nordhoff, English-American lieutenant, pilot, and author (died 1947)
- 1890 – Nikolai Reek, Estonian general and politician, 11th Estonian Minister of War (died 1942)
- 1894 – John Ford, American director and producer (died 1973)
- 1894 – James P. Johnson, American pianist and composer (died 1955)
- 1895 – Conn Smythe, Canadian businessman (died 1980)
- 1897 – Denise Robins, English journalist and author (died 1985)
- 1898 – Leila Denmark, American pediatrician and author (died 2012)

=== 1901–present ===
- 1901 – Frank Buckles, American soldier (died 2011)
- 1901 – Clark Gable, American actor (died 1960)
- 1902 – Therese Brandl, German concentration camp guard (died 1947)
- 1902 – Langston Hughes, American poet, social activist, novelist, and playwright (died 1967)
- 1904 – S. J. Perelman, American humorist and screenwriter (died 1979)
- 1905 – Emilio Segrè, Italian-American physicist and academic, Nobel Prize laureate (died 1989)
- 1906 – Adetokunbo Ademola, Nigerian lawyer and jurist, 2nd Chief Justice of Nigeria (died 1993)
- 1907 – Günter Eich, German author and songwriter (died 1972)
- 1907 – Camargo Guarnieri, Brazilian pianist and composer (died 1993)
- 1908 – George Pal, Hungarian-American animator and producer (died 1980)
- 1908 – Louis Rasminsky, Canadian economist and banker (died 1998)
- 1909 – George Beverly Shea, Canadian-American singer-songwriter (died 2013)
- 1910 – Ngapoi Ngawang Jigme, Chinese general and politician (died 2009)
- 1915 – Stanley Matthews, English footballer and manager (died 2000)
- 1917 – José Luis Sampedro, Spanish economist and author (died 2013)
- 1917 – Eiji Sawamura, Japanese baseball player and soldier (died 1944)
- 1918 – Muriel Spark, Scottish novelist (died 2006)
- 1918 – Ignacy Tokarczuk, Polish archbishop (died 2012)
- 1920 – Zao Wou-Ki, Chinese-French painter (died 2013)
- 1921 – Teresa Mattei, Italian feminist partisan and politician (died 2013)
- 1922 – Renata Tebaldi, Italian soprano and actress (died 2004)
- 1923 – Ben Weider, Canadian businessman, co-founded the International Federation of BodyBuilding & Fitness (died 2008)
- 1924 – Emmanuel Scheffer, German-Israeli footballer, coach, and manager (died 2012)
- 1926 – Vivian Maier, American street photographer (died 2009)
- 1927 – Galway Kinnell, American poet and academic (died 2014)
- 1928 – Sam Edwards, Welsh physicist and academic (died 2015)
- 1928 – Tom Lantos, Hungarian-American academic and politician (died 2008)
- 1928 – Stuart Whitman, American actor (died 2020)
- 1930 – Shahabuddin Ahmed, Bangladeshi judge and politician, 12th President of Bangladesh (died 2022)
- 1930 – Hussain Muhammad Ershad, Bangladeshi general and politician, 10th President of Bangladesh (died 2019)
- 1931 – Boris Yeltsin, Russian politician, 1st President of Russia (died 2007)
- 1932 – John Nott, British politician (died 2024)
- 1932 – Hassan al-Turabi, Sudanese activist and politician (died 2016)
- 1934 – Marina Kondratyeva, Russian ballet dancer (died 2024)
- 1936 – Tuncel Kurtiz, Turkish actor, playwright, and director (died 2013)
- 1937 – Don Everly, American singer-songwriter and guitarist (died 2021)
- 1937 – Garrett Morris, American actor and comedian
- 1938 – Jimmy Carl Black, American drummer and singer (died 2008)
- 1938 – Sherman Hemsley, American actor and singer (died 2012)
- 1939 – Fritjof Capra, Austrian physicist, author, and academic
- 1939 – Claude François, Egyptian-French singer-songwriter and dancer (died 1978)
- 1939 – Ekaterina Maximova, Russian ballerina (died 2009)
- 1939 – Joe Sample, American pianist and composer (died 2014)
- 1942 – Bibi Besch, Austrian-American actress (died 1996)
- 1942 – Terry Jones, Welsh actor, director, and screenwriter (died 2020)
- 1944 – Burkhard Ziese, German footballer and manager (died 2010)
- 1944 – Paul Blair, American baseball player and coach (died 2013)
- 1945 – Serge Joyal, Canadian lawyer and politician, 50th Secretary of State for Canada
- 1945 – Ferruccio Mazzola, Italian footballer and manager (died 2013)
- 1945 – Mary Jane Reoch, American cyclist (died 1993)
- 1946 – Karen Krantzcke, Australian tennis player (died 1977)
- 1946 – Elisabeth Sladen, English actress (died 2011)
- 1947 – Normie Rowe, Australian singer-songwriter and actor
- 1947 – Jessica Savitch, American journalist (died 1983)
- 1948 – Rick James, American singer-songwriter and producer (died 2004)
- 1949 – Lex Marinos, Australian actor (died 2024)
- 1950 – Mike Campbell, American guitarist, songwriter, and producer
- 1950 – Ali Haydar Konca, Turkish politician, 4th Turkish Minister of European Union Affairs
- 1950 – Rich Williams, American guitarist and songwriter
- 1951 – Sonny Landreth, American guitarist and songwriter
- 1952 – Owoye Andrew Azazi, Nigerian general (died 2012)
- 1954 – Chuck Dukowski, American singer-songwriter and bass player
- 1954 – Bill Mumy, American actor, writer, and musician
- 1955 – T. R. Dunn, American basketball player and coach
- 1956 – Exene Cervenka, American singer-songwriter and guitarist
- 1958 – Luther Blissett, Jamaican-English footballer and manager
- 1958 – Eleanor Laing, Scottish lawyer and politician, Shadow Secretary of State for Scotland
- 1959 – Wade Wilson, American football player and coach (died 2019)
- 1961 – Volker Fried, German field hockey player and coach
- 1961 – Kaduvetti Guru, Indian politician (died 2018)
- 1961 – Daniel M. Tani, American engineer and astronaut
- 1962 – José Luis Cuciuffo, Argentinian footballer (died 2004)
- 1962 – Tomoyasu Hotei, Japanese singer-songwriter and guitarist
- 1962 – Takashi Murakami, Japanese painter and sculptor
- 1964 – Jani Lane, American singer-songwriter and guitarist (died 2011)
- 1964 – Eli Ohana, Israeli football player, and club chairman
- 1964 – Linus Roache, English actor
- 1965 – Sherilyn Fenn, American actress
- 1965 – Brandon Lee, American actor and martial artist (died 1993)
- 1965 – Stéphanie of Monaco
- 1966 – Michelle Akers, American soccer player
- 1967 – Meg Cabot, American author and screenwriter
- 1968 – Lisa Marie Presley, American singer-songwriter and actress (died 2023)
- 1968 – Mark Recchi, Canadian ice hockey player and coach
- 1968 – Pauly Shore, American actor and comedian
- 1969 – Gabriel Batistuta, Argentinian footballer
- 1969 – Andrew Breitbart, American journalist, author, and publisher (died 2012)
- 1969 – Brian Krause, American actor
- 1969 – Joshua Redman, American musician and composer
- 1969 – Franklyn Rose, Jamaican cricketer
- 1969 – Patrick Wilson, American musician and songwriter
- 1970 – Yasuyuki Kazama, Japanese racing driver
- 1970 – Malik Sealy, American basketball player and actor (died 2000)
- 1971 – Michael C. Hall, American actor and producer
- 1971 – Tommy Salo, Swedish ice hockey player
- 1972 – Leymah Gbowee, Liberian peace activist
- 1972 – Christian Ziege, German footballer
- 1972 – Geoff Sanderson, Canadian ice hockey player
- 1973 – Andrew DeClercq, American basketball player and coach
- 1973 – Óscar Pérez, Mexican footballer
- 1974 – Walter McCarty, American basketball player and coach
- 1975 – Big Boi, American rapper
- 1975 – Martijn Reuser, Dutch footballer
- 1975 – Tomáš Vlasák, Czech ice hockey player
- 1976 – Mat Rogers, Australian rugby player
- 1977 – Phil Ivey, American poker player
- 1977 – Robert Traylor, American basketball player (died 2011)
- 1978 – Tim Harding, Australian singer and actor
- 1979 – Valentín Elizalde, Mexican singer-songwriter (died 2006)
- 1979 – Jason Isbell, American singer-songwriter and guitarist
- 1979 – Juan, Brazilian footballer
- 1980 – Héctor Luna, Dominican baseball player
- 1981 – Hins Cheung, Hong Kong singer-songwriter
- 1981 – Christian Giménez, Argentinian footballer
- 1981 – Graeme Smith, South African cricketer
- 1982 – Gavin Henson, Welsh rugby player
- 1982 – Shoaib Malik, Pakistani cricketer
- 1983 – Kevin Martin, American basketball player
- 1983 – Jurgen Van den Broeck, Belgian cyclist
- 1983 – Andrew VanWyngarden, American singer-songwriter and musician
- 1984 – Darren Fletcher, Scottish footballer
- 1985 – Dean Shiels, Irish footballer
- 1986 – Jorrit Bergsma, Dutch speed skater
- 1986 – Lauren Conrad, American fashion designer and author
- 1986 – Ladislav Šmíd, Czech ice hockey player
- 1987 – Sebastian Boenisch, Polish footballer
- 1987 – Moises Henriques, Portuguese-Australian cricketer
- 1987 – Austin Jackson, American baseball player
- 1987 – Heather Morris, American actress, singer, and dancer
- 1987 – Giuseppe Rossi, Italian footballer
- 1987 – Ronda Rousey, American mixed martial artist, wrestler and actress
- 1988 – Brett Anderson, American baseball player
- 1989 – Ricky Pinheiro, Portuguese footballer
- 1990 – Tyler Myers, American-Canadian ice hockey player
- 1991 – Blake Austin, Australian rugby league player
- 1991 – Kyle Palmieri, American ice hockey player
- 1992 – Sean Manaea, American baseball player
- 1993 – Diego Mella, Italian footballer
- 1994 – Anna-Lena Friedsam, German tennis player
- 1994 – Julia Garner, American actress
- 1994 – Harry Styles, English singer-songwriter and actor
- 1996 – Ahmad Abughaush, Jordanian taekwondo athlete
- 1996 – Doyoung, South Korean singer
- 1996 – Azurá Stevens, American basketball player
- 1997 – Drew Eubanks, American basketball player
- 1997 – Jihyo, South Korean singer
- 1998 – Jazz Chisholm Jr., Bahamian baseball player
- 1999 – Mohamed Abdelmonem, Egyptian footballer
- 2000 – Talanoa Hufanga, American football player
- 2001 – Egor Chinakhov, Russian ice hockey player
- 2002 – Brian Brobbey, Dutch footballer
- 2002 – Seth Jarvis, Canadian ice hockey player

== Deaths ==
=== Pre-1600 ===
- 583 – Kan Bahlam I, ruler of Palenque (born 524)
- 772 – Pope Stephen III (born 720)
- 850 – Ramiro I, king of Asturias
- 1222 – Alexios Megas Komnenos, first Emperor of Trebizond
- 1248 – Henry II, Duke of Brabant (born 1207)
- 1328 – Charles IV of France (born 1294)
- 1501 – Sigismund of Bavaria (born 1439)
- 1542 – Girolamo Aleandro, Italian cardinal (born 1480)
- 1563 – Menas of Ethiopia
- 1590 – Lawrence Humphrey, English theologian and academic (born 1527)

=== 1601–1900 ===
- 1691 – Pope Alexander VIII (born 1610)
- 1718 – Charles Talbot, 1st Duke of Shrewsbury, English politician, Lord High Treasurer (born 1660)
- 1733 – Augustus II the Strong, Polish king (born 1670)
- 1734 – John Floyer, English physician and author (born 1649)
- 1743 – Giuseppe Ottavio Pitoni, Italian organist and composer (born 1657)
- 1750 – Bakar of Kartli (born 1700)
- 1761 – Pierre François Xavier de Charlevoix, French priest and historian (born 1682)
- 1768 – Sir Robert Rich, 4th Baronet, English field marshal and politician (born 1685)
- 1793 – William Barrington, 2nd Viscount Barrington, English politician, Chancellor of the Exchequer (born 1717)
- 1803 – Anders Chydenius, Finnish economist, philosopher and Lutheran priest (born 1729)
- 1832 – Archibald Murphey, American judge and politician (born 1777)
- 1851 – Mary Shelley, English novelist and playwright (born 1797)
- 1871 – Alexander Serov, Russian composer and critic (born 1820)
- 1893 – George Henry Sanderson, American lawyer and politician, 22nd Mayor of San Francisco (born 1824)
- 1897 – Constantin von Ettingshausen, Austrian geologist and botanist (born 1826)

=== 1901–present ===
- 1903 – Sir George Stokes, Anglo-Irish physicist, mathematician, and politician (born 1819)
- 1907 – Léon Serpollet, French businessman (born 1858)
- 1908 – Carlos I of Portugal (born 1863)
- 1916 – James Boucaut, English-Australian politician, 11th Premier of South Australia (born 1831)
- 1917 – Georg Andreas Bull, Norwegian architect (born 1829)
- 1922 – William Desmond Taylor, American actor and director (born 1872)
- 1924 – Maurice Prendergast, American painter (born 1858)
- 1928 – Hughie Jennings, American baseball player and manager (born 1869)
- 1936 – Georgios Kondylis, Greek general and politician, 128th Prime Minister of Greece (born 1878)
- 1940 – Philip Francis Nowlan, American author, created Buck Rogers (born 1888)
- 1940 – Zacharias Papantoniou, Greek journalist and critic (born 1877)
- 1944 – Piet Mondrian, Dutch-American painter (born 1872)
- 1949 – Nicolae Dumitru Cocea, Romanian journalist, author, and activist (born 1880)
- 1949 – Herbert Stothart, American conductor and composer (born 1885)
- 1957 – Friedrich Paulus, German general (born 1890)
- 1958 – Clinton Davisson, American physicist and academic, Nobel Prize laureate (born 1888)
- 1959 – Madame Sul-Te-Wan, American actress (born 1873)
- 1965 – Johan Scharffenberg, Norwegian psychiatrist (born 1869)
- 1966 – Hedda Hopper, American actress and journalist (born 1885)
- 1966 – Buster Keaton, American actor, director, producer, and screenwriter (born 1895)
- 1968 – Echol Cole and Robert Walker - sparking the Memphis Sanitation Workers Strike
- 1970 – Alfréd Rényi, Hungarian mathematician and academic (born 1921)
- 1976 – Werner Heisenberg, German physicist and academic, Nobel Prize laureate (born 1901)
- 1976 – George Whipple, American physician and pathologist, Nobel Prize laureate (born 1878)
- 1979 – Abdi İpekçi, Turkish journalist and activist (born 1929)
- 1980 – Yolanda González (activist), Basque activist (born1961)
- 1981 – Donald Wills Douglas, Sr., American engineer and businessman, founded the Douglas Aircraft Company (born 1892)
- 1981 – Geirr Tveitt, Norwegian pianist and composer (born 1908)
- 1986 – Alva Myrdal, Swedish sociologist and politician, Nobel Prize laureate (born 1902)
- 1987 – Alessandro Blasetti, Italian director and screenwriter (born 1900)
- 1988 – Heather O'Rourke, American child actress (born 1975)
- 1989 – Elaine de Kooning, American painter and academic (born 1918)
- 1989 – Eduardo Franco, Uruguayan lead singer of the band "Los Iracundos" (born 1945)
- 1991 – Ahmad Abd al-Ghafur Attar, Saudi Arabian writer and journalist (born 1916)
- 1992 – Jean Hamburger, French physician and surgeon (born 1909)
- 1993 – Sven Thofelt, Swedish modern pentathlete and épée fencer (born 1904)
- 1996 – Ray Crawford, American race car driver, pilot, and businessman (born 1915)
- 1997 – Herb Caen, American journalist and author (born 1916)
- 1999 – Paul Mellon, American art collector and philanthropist (born 1907)
- 2001 – André D'Allemagne, Canadian political scientist and academic (born 1929)
- 2002 – Aykut Barka, Turkish geologist and academic (born 1951)
- 2002 – Hildegard Knef, German actress and singer (born 1925)
- 2003 – Space Shuttle Columbia crew
  - Michael P. Anderson, American colonel, pilot, and astronaut (born 1959)
  - David M. Brown, American captain, pilot, and astronaut (born 1956)
  - Kalpana Chawla, Indian-American engineer and astronaut (born 1961)
  - Laurel Clark, American captain, surgeon, and astronaut (born 1961)
  - Rick Husband, American colonel, pilot, and astronaut (born 1957)
  - William C. McCool, American commander, pilot, and astronaut (born 1961)
  - Ilan Ramon, Israeli colonel, pilot, and astronaut (born 1954)
- 2003 – Mongo Santamaría, Cuban-American drummer and bandleader (born 1922)
- 2004 – Suha Arın, Turkish director, producer, and screenwriter (born 1942)
- 2005 – John Vernon, Canadian-American actor (born 1932)
- 2007 – Gian Carlo Menotti, Italian-American playwright and composer (born 1911)
- 2008 – Beto Carrero, Brazilian actor and businessman (born 1937)
- 2010 – Jack Brisco, American professional wrestler (born 1941)
- 2012 – Don Cornelius, American television host and producer (born 1936)
- 2012 – Wisława Szymborska, Polish poet and translator, Nobel Prize laureate (born 1923)
- 2013 – Helene Hale, American politician (born 1918)
- 2013 – Ed Koch, American lawyer, judge, and politician, 105th Mayor of New York City (born 1924)
- 2013 – Shanu Lahiri, Indian painter and educator (born 1928)
- 2013 – Cecil Womack, American singer-songwriter and producer (born 1947)
- 2014 – Luis Aragonés, Spanish footballer and manager (born 1938)
- 2014 – Vasily Petrov, Russian marshal (born 1917)
- 2014 – Rene Ricard, American poet, painter, and critic (born 1946)
- 2014 – Maximilian Schell, Austrian-Swiss actor, director, producer, and screenwriter (born 1930)
- 2015 – Aldo Ciccolini, Italian-French pianist (born 1925)
- 2015 – Udo Lattek, German footballer, manager, and sportscaster (born 1935)
- 2015 – Monty Oum, American animator, director, and screenwriter (born 1981)
- 2016 – Óscar Humberto Mejía Victores, Guatemalan general and politician, 27th President of Guatemala (born 1930)
- 2017 – Desmond Carrington, British actor and broadcaster (born 1926)
- 2018 – Barys Kit, Belarusian rocket scientist (born 1910)
- 2018 – Mowzey Radio, Ugandan singer and songwriter (born 1985)
- 2019 – Jeremy Hardy, English comedian, radio host and panelist (born 1961)
- 2019 – Clive Swift, English actor (born 1936)
- 2019 – Wade Wilson, American football player and coach (born 1959)
- 2021 – Dustin Diamond, American actor, director, stand-up comedian, and musician (born 1977)
- 2021 – Temur Tsiklauri, Georgian pop singer and actor (born 1946)
- 2022 – Remi De Roo, Canadian bishop of the Catholic Church (born 1924)
- 2025 – Horst Köhler, Polish-German economist and politician, 9th President of Germany (born 1943)
- 2025 – Fay Vincent, American lawyer and businessman, 8th Commissioner of Baseball (born 1938)

== Holidays and observances ==
- Abolition of Slavery Day (Mauritius)
- Air Force Day (Nicaragua)
- Christian feast day:
  - Blessed Candelaria of San José
  - Brigid of Ireland (Saint Brigid's Day)
  - Verdiana
  - February 1 (Eastern Orthodox liturgics)
- Earliest day on which Constitution Day can fall, while February 7 is the latest; celebrated on the first Monday in February. (Mexico)
- Federal Territory Day (Kuala Lumpur, Labuan and Putrajaya, Malaysia)
- Foundation Day (of the Ryukyu Kingdom, celebrated in Okinawa Prefecture)
- Heroes Day (Rwanda)
- Saint Brigid's Day/Imbolc (Ireland, Scotland, Isle of Man, and some Neopagan groups in the Northern hemisphere)
- Memorial Day of the Republic (Hungary)
- National Freedom Day (United States)
- The start of Black History Month (United States and Canada)
- World Hijab Day

== International Border Change ==
Every year on February 1, Pheasant Island is transferred from France to Spain.
