= Shenouda =

Shenouda (Egyptian Arabic: شنودة, pronounced [ʃeˈnuːdæ]) is a male Egyptian Arabic given name, principally used by the Copts, Egyptian Christians. The name is a variant of Shenoute (Coptic: Ϣⲉⲛⲟⲩϯ, Šinouti or Šinoude, "Son of God"), a compound of the Coptic words šēri (ϣⲏⲣⲓ, "boy, son") and Nouti or Noude (Ⲛⲟⲩϯ, "God"). The variant forms of the Coptic name derive from its former regional dialects.

== People ==
Some of the most famous people with this name include:

- Saint Shenouda the Archimandrite
- Pope Shenouda I of Alexandria (r. 859–880)
- Pope Shenouda II of Alexandria (r. 1032–1046)
- Pope Shenouda III of Alexandria (r. 1971–2012)

== See also ==
- Shenoute
