= Paromeos Monastery =

Coptic Orthodox monastery in Egypt

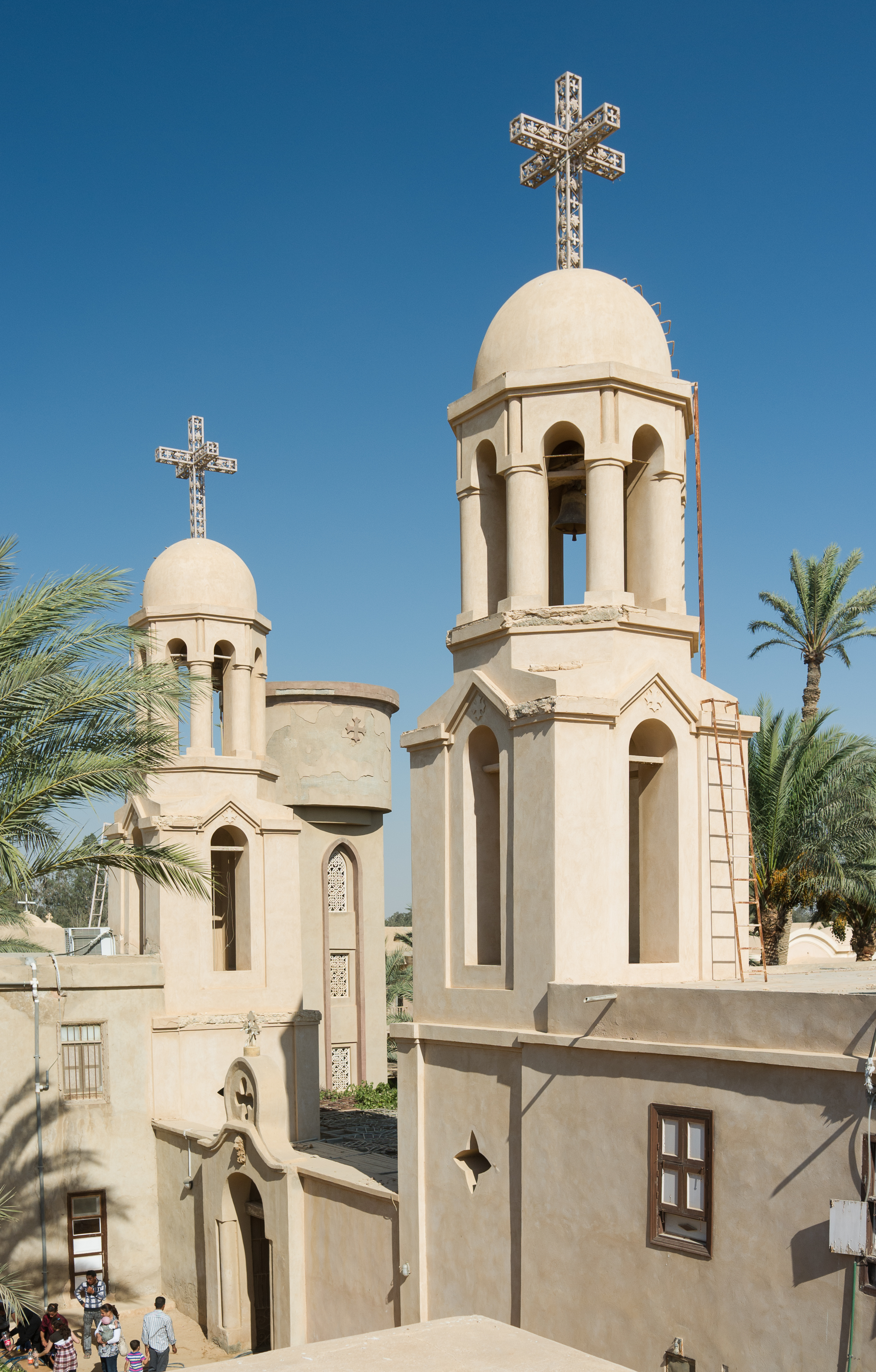

- Location within Egypt
- Interactive map of Paromeos Monastery

Monastery information
- Other names: Monastery of the Roman Saints Maximus & Domitius
- Established: 335; 1691 years ago
- Dedication: Virgin Mary
- Diocese: Coptic Orthodox Church of Alexandria

People
- Founder: Saint Macarius the Great
- Important associated figures: Saint Isidore; Saint Moses the Black

Site
- Location: Wadi El Natrun
- Country: Egypt
- Coordinates: 30.35713°N 30.27059°E
- Public access: Yes

Paromeos Monastery (Coptic: ⲡⲁⲣⲟⲙⲉⲟⲥ), also known as Baramos Monastery (Arabic: البراموس), is a Coptic Orthodox monastery located in Wadi El Natrun in the Nitrian Desert, Beheira Governorate, Egypt. It is the most northern among the four current monasteries of Scetis, situated around 9 km northeast of the Monastery of Saint Pishoy. Ecclesiastically, the monastery is dedicated to and named after the Virgin Mary.

== Etymology, foundation and ancient history ==
Paromeos Monastery is probably the oldest among the four existing monasteries of Scetes. It was founded c. 335 A.D. by Saint Macarius the Great. The name Pa-Romeos or that of the Romans may refer to Saints Maximus and Domatius, children of the Roman Emperor Valentinian I, who had their cell at the place of the modern monastery. According to Coptic tradition, the two saints went to Scetes during the time of Saint Macarius the Great, who tried in vain to dissuade them from staying. Nevertheless, they stayed and attained perfection before dying at a young age. A year after their departure, Saint Macarius the Great consecrated their cell by building a chapel, and told the monks "Call this place the Cell of the Romans". Another theory holds that the name refers to the Roman Emperors Arcadius and Honorius, disciples of Saint Arsenius. The latter was himself a Roman monk who established himself in Scetes, and it is possible that the two emperors had visited their teacher in his seclusion, thus giving to the monastery its name.

Following the destruction of the monastery in 405 A.D. by the Berbers and the Bedouins, Saint Arsenius returned to rebuild it. However, following a second raid also by the Berbers in 410 A.D., he retired to Troe, now a neighbourhood of Cairo known as Tura, where he died.

Beside Saint Macarius the Great and Saint Arsenius, other saints of the fourth and fifth century resided in Paromeos Monastery, such as Saint Isidore, and Saint Moses the Black who was martyred at the raid of 405 A.D.

== Early history ==
As a result of the attacks by the Berbers and the Bedouins, Pope Shenouda I of Alexandria (859-880) built walls around the monasteries of the Nitrian Desert. Their height varies between ten and eleven meters, and their widths are about two meters. They were also covered with a thick layer of plaster.

During the first half of the fifteenth century, the historian Al-Maqrizi visited the monastery and was responsible for identifying it as that of Saint Moses the Black. At that time, he found it to have only a few monks. Other famous visitors included Jean Coppin in 1638, Jean de Thévenot in 1657, Benoît de Maillet in 1692, Du Bernat in 1710, Claude Sicard in 1712, Sonnini in 1778, Lord Prudhoe in 1828, Lord Curzon in 1837, Tattam in 1839, Tischendorf in 1845, Jullien in 1881 and Butler in 1883. Information from them and a few other travelers provide that there were 712 monks who lived in seven monasteries in this region, including twenty monks at Paromeos Monastery in 1088, twelve monks in 1712, nine in 1799, seven in 1842, thirty in 1905, thirty-five in 1937, twenty in 1960 and forty-six in 1970. Today, the monastery is inhabited by some fifty monks.

Though the community of monks was fairly insignificant during this period, Paromeos Monastery apparently supplied one monk to the patriarchal throne in 1047, Pope Christodolos of Alexandria, who proved to be a man of great holiness. The monastery also supplied two monks in the seventeenth century to the patriarchal throne, Pope Matthew III of Alexandria and Pope Matthew IV of Alexandria. In the 20th century the monastery also supplied one monk (Abouna Mina) to the patriarchal throne, Pope Kyrillos VI of Alexandria. The monastery also produced a number of outstanding theologians, including Father Naum, and Father Abdel Massih ibn Girgis el Masuudi, both of the nineteenth century.

== Modern history ==
Today, the monastery still preserves much of its ancient character. It has five churches. The oldest church is dedicated to the Virgin Mary and contains the relics of Saint Moses the Black. It is considered the oldest church in Scetes still in existence, dating back to the sixth century. The second church is dedicated to Saint Theodore of Amasea, the third to Saint George, the fourth to Saint John the Baptist, and the fifth to Archangel Michael. The walls built by Pope Shenouda I of Alexandria are still standing today. The monastery also contains a keep, a tower, two refectories, and a guest house.

About two and a half kilometers northwest of this monastery, there is also the limestone cave of the late Pope Cyril VI. Marked by twelve wooden crosses, it is known as the Rock of Sarabamun and has become a popular place of pilgrimage. An iron lattice-work protects the entrance to the site. Within, the one room cave is spacious. It is adorned with numerous pictures and icons of Pope Cyril VI. In the desert about the monastery there are also several caves that apparently continue to be inhabited by hermits.

Under Pope Shenouda III, a number of recent renovations were performed at the monastery. An asphalt road to the monastery was built, and there have been several major cultivation projects. In addition, six water pumps, a sheepfold, a henhouse and two generators were added, together with the construction of new residential cells both inside and outside the monastery proper. There is now a clinic and a pharmacy to serve the monks, as well as a spacious retreat center for conferences and a large, two story guesthouse that was opened in January 1981.

== Ruins and excavations ==
Since 1996, the Netherlands Organization for Scientific Research (NWO) and the Faculty of Archaeology of the University of Leiden have financed the archaeological research on the remains of the site commonly known as the Monastery of Saint Moses the Black, near Paromeos Monastery. This monastery was surrounded by an enclosure wall that was perhaps a somewhat late addition during the ninth century.

Within the old monastery, archaeologists discovered the remains of a square structure measuring some sixteen meters square, in the southeastern corner of the site. Though its original purpose was at first unclear, it has now been determined to have most likely been a defensive tower, or keep that may have stood some twenty-five meters in height. However, pottery from the 4th or early 5th century found on the site suggest that this tower was built very early for monastic purposes, particularly with regards to what was probably a fairly small community of monks. It has been suggested that this may have originally been built as a Roman military structure in order to defend the Nitrian Desert and its salt production. Then, after having been abandoned during the fourth century, it may have been put to use by newly arrived anchorites.

In 1998, excavations uncovered a structure that proved later to be that of a church immediately north of the tower. The walls of the nave are made from poor quality and improvised masonry that suggest that the church was perhaps rebuilt hastily after having been destroyed. The actual sanctuary of this church is of better quality, and was apparently reconstructed somewhat later, perhaps at the end of the ninth or the beginning of the tenth century. The altar, which is fairly well preserved, sits atop a one step high podium.

Remains, probably of an earlier structure and consisting of more solid masonry of finely cut limestone blocks, were found in the western part of the church's nave. Since one of these blocks was inscribed with a number of hieroglyphics in high relief, it is very plausible that an Ancient Egyptian monument existed in close proximity to this site.

== Abbot ==
The Bishop and Abbot of Paromeos Monastery in Wadi Al-Natrun is Bishop Anba Isidoros since 14 June 1992.

== Popes from Paromeos Monastery ==
1. Pope Christodolos (1047–1077)
2. Pope John XIV (1571–1586)
3. Pope Matthew III (1631–1646)
4. Pope Matthew IV (1660–1675)
5. Pope Cyril V (1874–1927)
6. Pope John XIX (1928–1942)
7. Pope Cyril VI (1959–1971)

== Other monasteries of the Nitrian Desert ==
- The Monastery of Saint Pishoy
- The Monastery of Saint Macarius the Great
- The Syrian Monastery

== See also ==
- Macarius of Egypt
- Saint Arsenius
- Saint Moses the Black
- Coptic Orthodox Church of Alexandria
- Coptic monasticism
- Coptic architecture
- Desert Fathers
- Wadi El Natrun
