= John X bar Shushan =

71st Patriarch of Syriac Orthodox Church of Antioch

- Syriac Orthodox Patriarch of Antioch and All the East
- Church: Syriac Orthodox Church
- See: Antioch
- Installed: 1063/1064
- Term ended: 1072/1073
- Predecessor: Athanasius V Haya
- Successor: Baselius II

Personal details
- Born: Yeshu; Early 11th century Melitene
- Died: 6/27 November 1072/1073 Amid

John X bar Shushan (Note: He is also counted as John VIII, after John bar Abdun (r. 1004–1030) or John IX, after John bar Abdun (r. 1049-1057).) (Syriac: ܝܘܚܢܢ ܒܪ ܫܘܫܢ, Arabic: يوحنا ابن شوشان) was the Patriarch of Antioch, and head of the Syriac Orthodox Church, from 1063/1064 until his death in 1072/1073.

== Biography ==
Yeshu was born in the early 11th century at Melitene, where he studied philology, philosophy, and religion, and later became a monk at a nearby monastery. He studied under Patriarch John IX bar ʿAbdun, and served as his syncellus (secretary).

After the death of the patriarch John bar Abdun in 1057, Yeshu was elected and consecrated as patriarch of Antioch at Amid by eastern bishops under the jurisdiction of the maphrian, upon which he assumed the name John. Western bishops, who outnumbered the eastern bishops, disputed John's election, and elected Athanasius V as patriarch instead, and brought the issue to the Muslim rulers. John subsequently abdicated, allowing Athanasius to serve as patriarch until his death in 1063/1064, after which John was restored to the position.

For most of his tenure as patriarch, John made his residence at Amid, and also resided for a time at Harran and Maypherqat, which were under Muslim control, as opposed to Melitene, so to avoid eastern Roman persecution. Relations with the other non-Chalcedonian religious leaders were strained during John's reign as the church came under criticism for its practices, and John sent a treatise to the Armenian Catholicos Gregory II the Martyrophile in its defence. John also sent a letter to the Coptic Pope Christodoulos of Alexandria to refute criticism of the practice of mixing of salt and oil with the sacramental bread. He served as patriarch of Antioch until his death at Amid on 6 or 27 November 1072/1073.

== Works ==
John wrote extensively on theological, canonical, and liturgical matters. He composed seven books of propitiatory prayers (pl. Syriac: ḥusoye), four books of poetry on the Turkish sack of Melitene in 1058, and an anaphora. As well as the aforementioned letter and treatise in defence of the church's practices, John wrote two treatises to refute Islam and the Melkite church of Antioch.

== Bibliography ==
- Barsoum, Ephrem (2003). The Scattered Pearls: A History of Syriac Literature and Sciences. Translated by Matti Moosa (2nd ed.). Gorgias Press.
- Burleson, Samuel; Van Rompay, Lucas (2011). "List of Patriarchs: II. The Syriac Orthodox Church and its Uniate continuations". In Sebastian P. Brock; Aaron M. Butts; George A. Kiraz; Lucas Van Rompay (eds.). Gorgias Encyclopedic Dictionary of the Syriac Heritage: Electronic Edition. Gorgias Press.
- Teule, Herman G. B. (2011). "Yuhanna Yusha' ibn Shushan". In David Thomas; Alex Mallett (eds.). Christian-Muslim Relations: A Bibliographical History. Vol. 3. Brill. pp. 150–151.
- Van Rompay, Lucas (2011). "Yuḥanon X, Ishoʿ bar Shushan". In Sebastian P. Brock; Aaron M. Butts; George A. Kiraz; Lucas Van Rompay (eds.). Gorgias Encyclopedic Dictionary of the Syriac Heritage: Electronic Edition.
- Wilmshurst, David (2019). "West Syrian patriarchs and maphrians". In Daniel King (ed.). The Syriac World. Routledge. pp. 806–813.

Oriental Orthodox titles
Preceded by Athanasius V Haya	Syriac Orthodox Patriarch of Antioch; 1063/1064–1072/1073	Succeeded by Baselius II
