= Perpetua and Felicity =

Early-3rd-century Carthaginian Christian martyrs

Saints Perpetua and Felicity
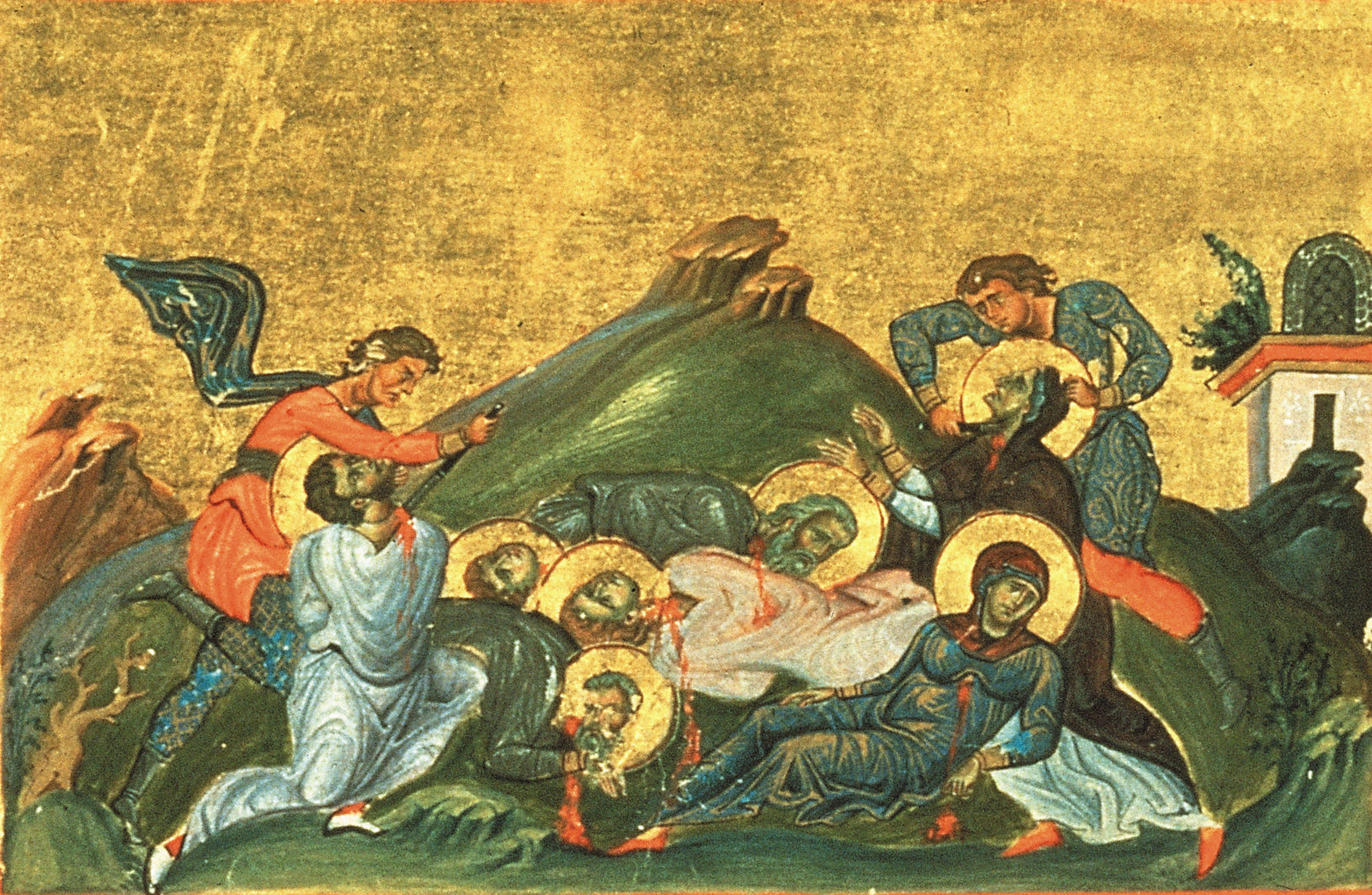
- The martyrdom of Perpetua, Felicitas, Revocatus, Saturninus and Saturus from the Menologion of Basil II (c. AD 1000)

Martyrs
- Born: c. 182; Carthage, Tunisia
- Died: c. 203 (aged 22); Carthage, Roman province of Africa
- Venerated in: Roman Catholic Church; Eastern Orthodox Churches; Oriental Orthodox Churches; Anglican Communion; Lutheran Church
- Canonized: Pre-congregation
- Feast: 1 February (Eastern Orthodox); 6 March (Roman Catholic, Extraordinary Form); 7 March (Anglican, generally; Lutheran; Roman Catholic, Ordinary Form and before 1908)
- Patronage: Mothers; Expectant Mothers; ranchers; butchers; Carthage; Catalonia

Perpetua and Felicity (Latin: Perpetua et Felicitas; c. 182 – c. 203) were Christian martyrs of the third century. Vibia Perpetua was a recently married, well-educated noblewoman, said to have been 22 years old at the time of her death, and mother of an infant son she was nursing. Felicity, a slave woman imprisoned with her and pregnant at the time, was martyred with her. They were put to death along with others at Carthage in the Roman province of Africa.

The Passion of Saints Perpetua and Felicity narrates their death. According to this text, five people were arrested and executed in military games to celebrate the birthday of Caesar Geta, the son of emperor Septimius Severus. Along with Felicity and Perpetua, these included two free men, Saturninus and Secundulus, and an enslaved man named Revocatus; all were catechumens (Christians being instructed in the faith but not yet baptized). To this group of five was added a sixth, Saturus, who voluntarily went before the magistrate and proclaimed himself to be Christian. Perpetua's first-person narrative was published posthumously as part of the Passion.

== Imprisonment ==
Perpetua's account opens with conflict between her and her father, who desires that she recant her belief. Perpetua refuses, and is soon baptized before being moved to prison. Perpetua was imprisoned in Carthage in the days leading up to her martyrdom. She described these days and what she endured in her diary.

Perpetua described the physical and emotional torments that she suffered in the prison leading up to her martyrdom or death. Perpetua suffered physically due to the heat, rough prison guards, and the cessation of regular breastfeeding. Perpetua also described how the prison conditions improved after she was able to bribe the guards so that she and the other martyrs were moved to another part of the prison, with her infant. Her physical torment was also eased after she was able to breastfeed her child. Perpetua described bodily ailments in detail and the most common in her narrative was the cycle of pain and relief she would feel in her breasts.

At the encouragement of her brother, Perpetua asks for and receives a vision, in which she climbs a dangerous ladder to which various weapons are attached. At the foot of a ladder is a serpent, which is faced first by Saturus and later by Perpetua. The serpent does not harm her, and she ascends to a garden. At the conclusion of her dream, Perpetua realizes that the martyrs will suffer.

The day before her martyrdom, Perpetua envisions herself defeating a savage Egyptian and interprets this to mean that she would have to do battle not merely with wild beasts, but with the Devil as well.

== Veneration ==
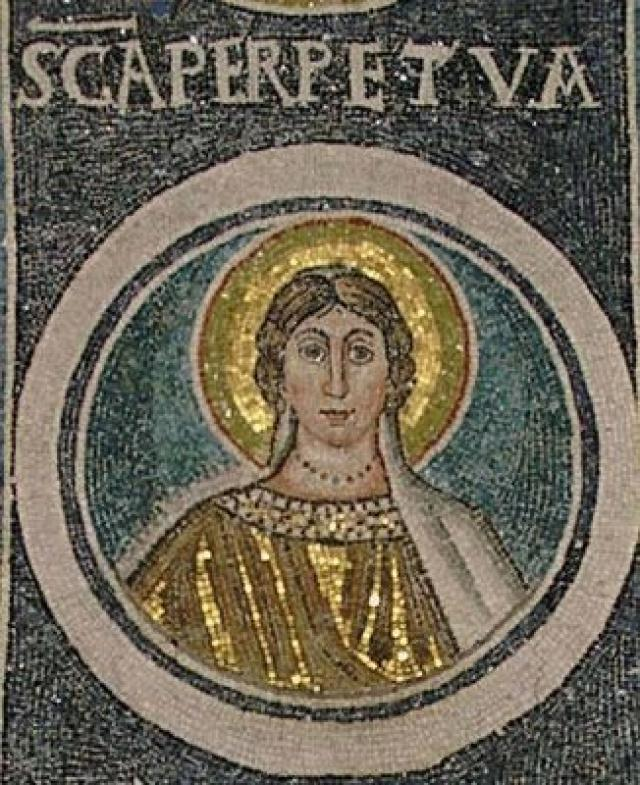
Mosaic of Saint Perpetua, Euphrasian Basilica, Poreč, Croatia

In Carthage, a basilica was erected over the tomb of the martyrs, the Basilica Maiorum, where an ancient inscription bearing the names of Perpetua and Felicitas has been found.

Saints Felicitas and Perpetua are among the martyrs commemorated by name in the Roman Canon of the Mass.

The feast day of Saints Perpetua and Felicitas, 7 March, was celebrated across the Roman Empire and was entered in the Philocalian Calendar, the fourth-century calendar of martyrs venerated publicly in Rome. When Saint Thomas Aquinas's feast was inserted into the Roman calendar, for celebration on the same day, the two African saints were thenceforth only commemorated. The Tridentine calendar, established by Pope Pius V, continued to commemorate the two until 1908, when Pope Pius X brought the date for celebrating them forward to 6 March. In the 1969 revision of the General Roman Calendar, the feast of Saint Thomas Aquinas was moved, and that of Saints Perpetua and Felicity was restored to their traditional 7 March date.

Other churches, including the Lutheran Church and the Episcopal Church, commemorate these two martyrs on 7 March, never having altered the date to 6 March. The Anglican Church of Canada, however, historically commemorated them on 6 March (The Book of Common Prayer, 1962), but have since changed to the traditional 7 March date (Book of Alternative Services, 1985).

Perpetua and Felicity are remembered in the Church of England and the Episcopal Church on 7 March.

In the Eastern Orthodox Church the feast day of Saints Perpetua of Carthage and the catechumens Saturus, Revocatus, Saturninus, Secundulus, and Felicitas is 1 February.

== Biography ==
- Farina, William, Perpetua of Carthage: Portrait of a Third-Century Martyr, (McFarland and Company, Inc., Publishers, 2009

== See also ==
- Domnina, Berenice, and Prosdoce
- List of Christian women of the patristic age
