= Philotheos (Coptic patriarch of Alexandria) =

Head of the Coptic Church from 979 to 1003

Pope Philotheos of Alexandria
- Pope of Alexandria and Patriarch of the See of St. Mark
- Papacy began: 979
- Papacy ended: 1003
- Predecessor: Abraham
- Successor: Zacharias

Personal details
- Born: Egypt
- Died: 1003
- Buried: Damrua
- Denomination: Coptic Orthodox Christian
- Residence: Saint Mark's Church

Pope Philotheos of Alexandria, (died 1003) was the 63rd Pope of Alexandria and Patriarch of the See of St. Mark.

It was during his office that a conflict between Alexandria and the King of Axum that began in the time of Cosmas III ended, helped by the efforts of Georgios II of Makuria. Due to Georgios' successful diplomacy, Philotheos ordained a new abuna or metropolitan bishop, Abuna Daniel, for the Ethiopian Orthodox Church after an interregnum of many years.

After his death, the bishops became aware that a rich monk had bribed Governor El-Khalifa to become the new leader; in response, they quickly appointed Abba Zacharias instead.

His feast day is 12/13 Hatur.

Preceded by Abraham	Coptic Pope; 979–1003	Succeeded by Zacharias
