= Moses the Black =

Monk, priest and martyr in Egypt (c. 330 – c. 405)

Saint Moses the Black
- Fresco of Moses the Black, 13th century

Desert Father Hieromonk and Hieromartyr
- Born: c. AD 330; Egypt
- Died: c. 405 (aged 75); Scetis, Roman Egypt, Eastern Roman Empire
- Venerated in: Eastern Orthodox Church; Oriental Orthodoxy; Catholic Church; Anglican Communion; Lutheranism; Assyrian Church of the East
- Canonized: Pre-congregation
- Major shrine: Paromeos Monastery, Scetis, Egypt
- Feast: 28 August (Eastern Orthodox Church, Catholic Church, Syriac Orthodox Church); 1 July; 24 Paoni (Coptic Orthodox Church); 2 July (Episcopal Church)
- Patronage: Africa, nonviolence

Moses the Black (Note: Coptic: Ⲙⲟⲥⲉⲥ; Greek: Μωϋσῆς ὁ Αἰθίοψ, romanized: Mōüsês ho Aithíops; Arabic: موسى الحبشي) (c. AD 330 – c. 405), also known as Moses the Strong, Moses the Robber, and Moses the Ethiopian, was a Christian ascetic hieromonk in Egypt in the fourth century AD and a Desert Father. He had lived a life of crime, but he later converted to Christianity and lived a life of asceticism.

Moses had been committing crimes, including murder and leading a band of robbers, until he found himself at a monastery led by ascetic Christian monks. Inspired by them, he then gave up his old ways to convert and join the monastery, where he began a life of asceticism, while still struggling to reconcile his past with his new life. Eventually, he would be ordained priest and become one of the great fathers of Scetis. According to the Sayings of the Desert Fathers, Moses was martyred after Scetis came under attack.

Moses is venerated as a saint by the Eastern Orthodox Church, Oriental Orthodox Churches, Catholic Church, Lutheranism, and Anglican Communion.

== Biography ==
=== Early life ===
Saint Moses the Black lived during the fourth century in Egypt. He was black-skinned; therefore, he was called "Ethiopian" (in Ancient Greek, “Ethiopian” meant “burnt-faced”). In his youth, he was the slave of a government official, but after committing a murder, his master banished him, and he joined a band of robbers. He then roamed the Nile Valley with an infamous and violent gang of 75 robbers. Moses was a man of huge physical stature, strength and courage, and became leader of this gang of robbers that became a social menace and living terror to the communities where they roamed.

=== Conversion to Christianity ===
On one occasion, a barking dog prevented Moses from carrying out a robbery, so he swore vengeance on the owner. In a second attempt, with a sword in his mouth, Moses swam across the Nile towards the owner's hut. The owner, again alerted, was able to hide, and the frustrated Moses stole four of his sheep and took them to slaughter, selling their fleece in exchange for wine. Attempting to hide from local authorities, he took shelter with some monks in a colony in the desert of Wadi El Natrun, then called Scetis, near Alexandria. The dedication of their lives, as well as their peace and contentment, influenced Moses deeply. He soon gave up his old way of life, became a Christian, was baptized and joined the monastic community at Scetis.

Moses steals the sheep, from an Italo-Byzantine manuscript of the Vitae patrum produced in Sicily in the 14th century

=== Monastic life ===
Moses had a rather difficult time adjusting to regular monastic discipline, and traces of his criminal tendencies lingered. Attacked by a group of robbers in his desert cell, Moses fought back, overpowered the intruders, and dragged them to the chapel where the other monks were at prayer. He told the brothers that he did not think it was Christian to hurt the robbers and asked what he should do with them. The robbers themselves repented and joined the community as brothers afterwards. Moses was zealous in all he did, but became discouraged when he concluded he was not perfect enough. Feeling overcome by despair and once again tempted by his former passions, early one morning, Isidore, abbot of the monastery, took Moses to the roof. Together they watched the first rays of dawn come over the horizon, and Isidore said to Moses, "Only slowly do the rays of the sun drive away the night and usher in a new day, and thus, only slowly does one become a perfect contemplative."

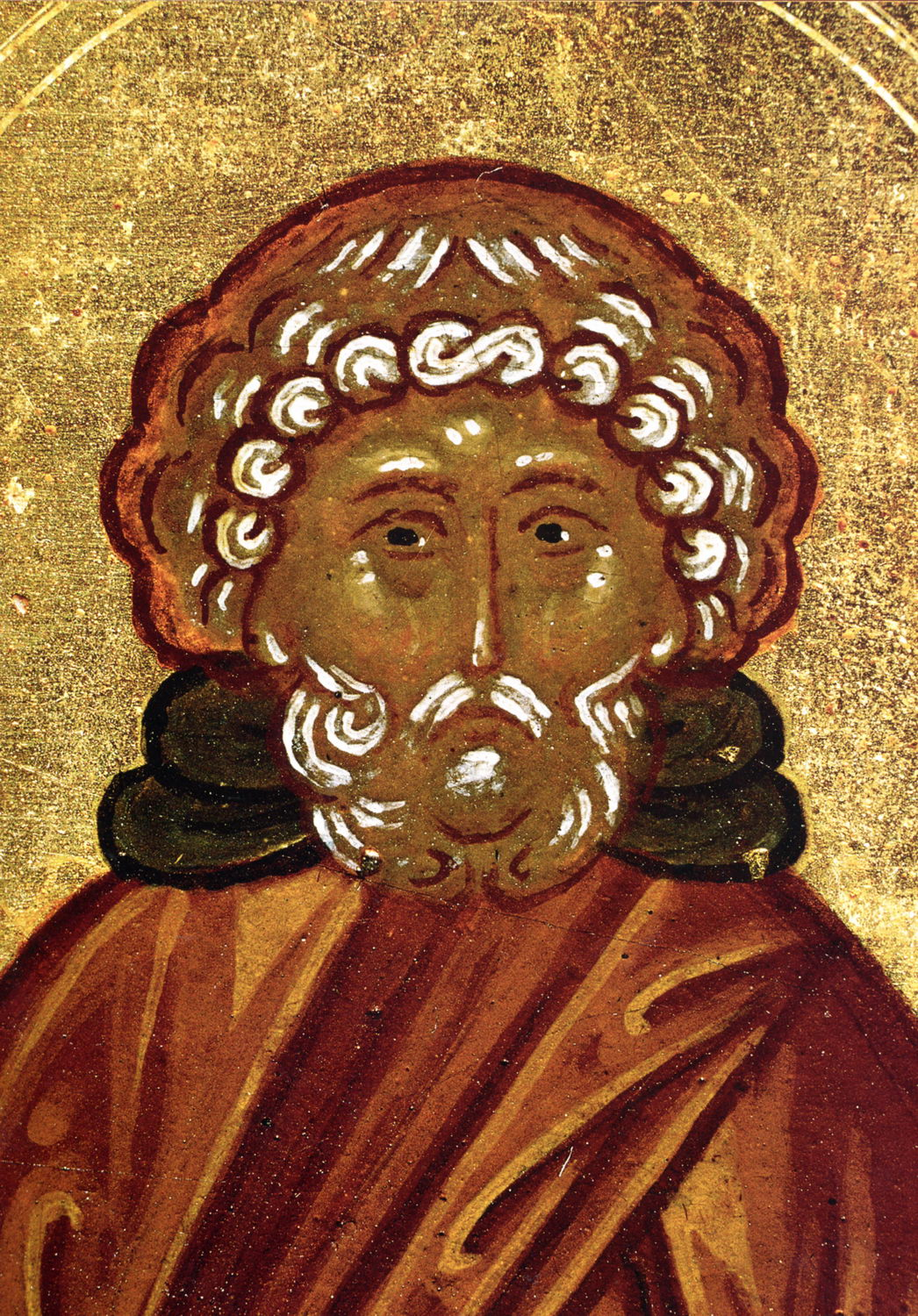
Reverend Moses Murin, fragment of a Novgorod icon, late 15th century.

Moses proved to be effective as a prophetic spiritual leader. The abbot ordered the brothers to fast during a particular week. Some brothers came to Moses, and he prepared a meal for them. Neighboring monks reported to the abbot that Moses was breaking the fast. When they came to confront Moses, they changed their minds, saying, "You did not keep a human commandment, but it was so that you might keep the divine commandment of hospitality." Some see in this account one of the earliest allusions to the Paschal fast, which developed at this time.

When a brother committed a fault and Moses was invited to a meeting to discuss an appropriate penance, Moses refused to attend. When he was again called to the meeting, Moses arrived with a sack filled with sand carried over his shoulder. Another version of the story has him carrying a basket filled with sand. When he arrived at the meeting place, the others asked why he was carrying the sack. He replied, "My sins run out behind me and I do not see them, but today I am coming to judge the errors of another." On hearing this, the assembled brothers forgave the erring monk.

Moses became the spiritual leader of a colony of hermits in the Western Desert. Later, he was ordained a priest.

=== Death ===
At about age 75, about the year 405 AD, word came that a group of barbarians planned to attack the monastery. The brothers wanted to defend themselves, but Moses forbade it. He told them to retreat, rather than take up weapons. Citing that a violent death was the appropriate death for a former robber—"All who take the sword will perish by the sword"—he opted to remain behind. There were seven brothers there who decided to stay with Moses. They were together martyred by the bandits. One of the brothers fled behind a rope. He saw seven crowns descend and crown the seven who had been killed.

== Legacy ==
Moses was highly praised by his contemporaries. In his 5th century AD Ecclesiastical History, Hermias Sozomen sums up Moses's legacy as follows:

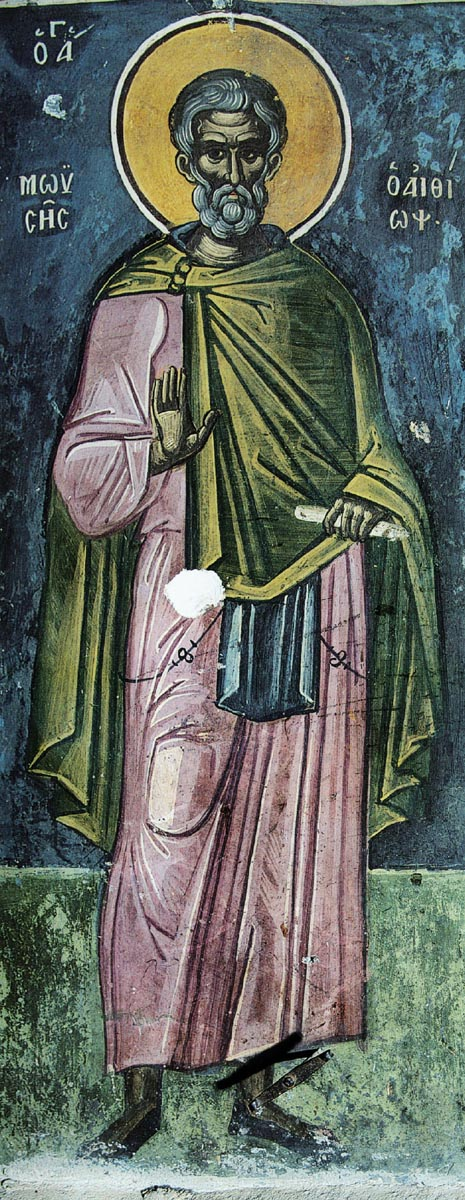
Fresco of Saint Moses from the Dionysiou Monastery, 1547

So sudden a conversion from vice to virtue was never before witnessed, nor such rapid attainments in monastical philosophy. Hence God rendered him an object of dread to the demons and he was ordained presbyter over the monks at Scetis. After a life spent in this manner, he died at the age of seventy-five, leaving behind him numerous eminent disciples.

— Sozomen, in his Ecclesiastical History, Book VI, Chapter XXIX

A modern interpretation honors Moses the Ethiopian as an apostle of non-violence. His relics and major shrine are found today at the Church of the Virgin Mary in the Paromeos Monastery, a Coptic Orthodox monastery located in Wadi El Natrun in Egypt.

Moses the Black’s life devoted to repentance and asceticism contributed to the development of early Christian monasticism and influenced figures such as John Cassian. Some of his well-known teachings include:

"Do no harm to anyone; do not think anything bad in your heart towards anyone; do not scorn the man who does evil, do not put confidence in him who does wrong to his neighbor; do not rejoice with him who injures his neighbor. This is what dying to one’s neighbor means."

"When someone is occupied with his own faults, he does not see those of neighbor."

"If a man’s deeds are not in harmony with his prayer, he labors in vain."

== Veneration ==
Moses' feast day in the Eastern Orthodox Church, Catholic Church and Syriac Orthodox Church is celebrated on 28 August. The Coptic Orthodox Church celebrates his feast day on 1 July; 24 Paoni.

The Episcopal Church celebrates his feast day on 2 July.

== See also ==
- Paromeos Monastery
- Or of Nitria
- Scetis
- Coptic Orthodox Church of Alexandria
- Coptic Catholic Church
- Monastery of St. Moses the Abyssinian
- Black people in ancient Roman history

== Primary sources ==
- Palladius (1918). The Lausiac History. London: The Macmillan Company.
- Sozomen, Hermias (2018). The Ecclesiastical History of Sozomen. Merchantville, NJ: Evolution Publishing. ISBN 978-1-935228-15-8.
