= Pope Christodoulos of Alexandria =

Head of the Coptic Church from 1047 to 1077

- Pope of Alexandria and Patriarch of the See of St. Mark
- Papacy began: 1047
- Papacy ended: 1077
- Predecessor: Shenouda II
- Successor: Cyril II

Personal details
- Born: Egypt
- Died: 1077 Egypt
- Buried: Monastery of Saint Macarius the Great
- Denomination: Coptic Orthodox Christian
- Residence: The Hanging Church

Pope Christodoulos of Alexandria, also known as Abd-el-Masih, was the 66th Pope of Alexandria and Patriarch of the See of St. Mark from 1047 until his death in 1077.

He joined the Paromeos Monastery in the Nitrian Desert before becoming a Pope. During his tenure Cairo became the fixed and official residence of the Coptic Pope, when he moved the Seat of the Coptic Orthodox Pope of Alexandria to Saint Mary's The Hanging Church in Cairo.

Infighting between the Saints Sergius and Bacchus Church and the El Muallaqa Church broke out due to the wishes of that patriarch's desire to be consecrated in the Hanging Church, a ceremony that traditionally took place at Saints Sergius and Bacchus.

Pope Christodoulos was the one who ordered that the Copts should standardize on the Bohairic Dialect, which was the dialect of parts of Northern Egypt and the monasteries of the Scetes. This was the dialect that was starting to weaken and give way to Arabic. His intention was to strengthen the weakening Coptic. However, he inadvertently helped weaken the Coptic further in the region where it was still going strong, the Sahidic region (Upper Egypt). It is not unexpected that Sahidic Coptic survived to the 15th and 16th century. We know of an Italian visitor to Upper Egypt in the 17th century who wrote that he met a Coptic priest and an old woman who could still speak Coptic

== Relations with Antioch ==
The Patriarchs of Antioch and the Pope of Alexandria had for many years kept in close touch with one another. More than once their relations were strained, as happened particularly in the time of Patriarch John IX bar Shushan, and Christodulus, when they fell out over the proper presentation of the Eucharistic oblations, in which the Syrians were in the habit of mingling a little oil and salt (Neale, Patriarchate of Alexandria, II, 214). Christodulus insultingly rejected the practice, and John of Antioch wrote in its defence. In 1169, a new controversy, about the use of auricular confession, temporarily severed the once friendly relations between the two communions.

== Ethiopia ==
Following the death of the Abuna of the Ethiopian Orthodox Church, the Emperor of Ethiopia sent an embassy asking Pope Christodoulos to ordain a new one. He replied that he was unable to ordain one due to persecution against the Christians in Egypt at the time. As a result, an adventurer named Abdun took advantage of this interregnum and presented himself to the Ethiopian Emperor with forged documents, claiming to be the newly appointed Abuna.

== Notes ==
Preceded by Shenouda II	Coptic Pope; 1047–1077	Succeeded by Cyril II
