= January 19 (Eastern Orthodox liturgics) =

Day in the Eastern Orthodox liturgical calendar

Eastern Orthodox liturgical calendar
January 18	January 19	January 20
January 19 O.S. ≍ February 1 N.S. January 19 N.S ≍ January 6 O.S.

An Eastern Orthodox cross

January 19 in Eastern Orthodox liturgical calendars is a feast day and a day of commemoration of saints and martyrs. Although some Orthodox churches use the Revised Julian Calendar and others use the traditional Julian calendar, the fixed commemorations for their respective January 19 are broadly the same, no matter which calendar is used. (Note: Despite the dates being the same, the days to which they refer typically differ by 13 days. The notation Old Style or O.S. is sometimes used to indicate a date in the traditional Julian Calendar (the "Old Calendar"). The notation New Style or N.S, indicates a date in the Revised Julian calendar (the "New Calendar").)

== Saints ==
- Martyr Germanicus of Smyrna (160)
- Virgin Martyr Euphrasia of Nicomedia (303)
- Saint Theodotus, Bishop of Cyrene (c. 307-323) (Note: The memory of Saint Theodotos, who hailed from Cyprus and lived during the time of Emperor Licinius (307-323 AD), is recorded in the Synaxaristes and in the Menaia on two occasions: on the 19th or 17th of January, the day of his release from prison; and on March 2, the day of his repose. The saint was persecuted and suffered much for his faith in Christ. He reposed peacefully however, likely in the period of Constantine the Great.)
- Venerable Macarius the Great of Egypt (390)
- Venerable Macarius the Younger of Alexandria (c. 394)
- Venerable Macarius, Bishop of Ierissos on the Chalkidiki peninsula (c. 395-408)
- Saints Maximos and Dometios (Maximus and Domatius) of Nitria (4th century)
- Venerable Anton (Anthony) the Stylite of Martqopi, founder of monasticism in Georgia, of the Thirteen Assyrian Fathers (6th century)
- Martyr Anthony Rawah the Qoraisite (797)
- Saint Arsenius, Archbishop of Corfu (Kerkyra) (953)

== Pre-Schism Western saints ==
- Martyr Pontian, in Spoleto, Italy under Marcus Aurelius (169) (Note: "At Spoleto, in the days of the emperor Antoninus, the passion of St. Pontian, martyr, who was barbarously scourged for Christ by the command of the judge Fabian, and then compelled to walk barefoot on burning coals. As he was uninjured by the tire, he was put on the rack, was torn with iron hooks, and then thrown into a dungeon, where he was comforted by the visit of an angel. He was afterwards exposed to the lions, had melted lead poured over him and finally died by the sword.")
- Virgin Martyr Messalina, in Foligno, Italy (251) (Note: A holy virgin in Foligno in Italy. She visited Bishop Felician of Foligno in prison, was denounced as a Christian and clubbed to death.)
- Martyrs Marius, Martha, Audifax, and Abachum, in Rome (270) (Note: Marius, a Persian nobleman, his wife Martha, and their two sons, Audifax and Abachum, travelled to Rome to venerate the tombs of the Apostles. While there, they also buried the bodies of those being martyred in the persecution of Claudius II. They too were arrested, the three men beheaded and St. Martha drowned.) (Note: "AT Rome, on the Cornelian road, the holy martyrs Marius and his wife Martha, with their sons Audifax and Abachum, noble Persians, who came to Rome, through devotion, in the time of the Emperor Claudius. After they had been beaten with rods, tortured on the rack and with fire, lacerated with iron hooks, and had endured the cutting off of their hands, Martha was put to death in the place called Nympha, The others were beheaded and cast into the flames.") (see also: July 6)
- Martyrs Paul, Gerontius, Januarius, Saturninus, Saccesius, Julius, Catius, Pius and Germanus, in Numidia in North Africa.
- Saint Firminus, third Bishop of Gévaudan (Gabales), France.
- Saint Bassian, Bishop of Lodi, Lombardy (413) (Note: Born in Sicily, he became Bishop of Lodi in Lombardy in Italy. He was much esteemed by St. Ambrose of Milan, with whom he attended the Council of Aquilia (381) and at whose repose he was present (390).)
- Saint Contestus (Contentius), Bishop of Bayeux, France from 480 on (510)
- Saint Laumer (Lomer, Laudomarus), Abbot of Corbion Monastery (593) (Note: A shepherd boy near Chartres in France and then priest, he became a hermit. Disciples came and he founded the monastery of Corbion near Chartres. He lived to be over a hundred.)
- Saint Branwalader (Breward) of Cornwall, Bishop in Jersey in the Channel Islands (6th century) (Note: King Athelstan, who founded the monastery of Milton in Dorset in England translated relics of the saint there in 935 AD: "When King Athelstan had founded the Abbey of Middleton, he was careful to enrich the church with many precious relics, which he collected from various parts of the world from Rome, from the Continental Brittany, and many other places. Among these sacred treasures was an arm of ST. BRANWALLATOR, Bishop, whose name was associated with those of our Blessed Lady, St. Michael, and St. Samson, in the dedication of the church. Who St. Branwallator was, we have no information; but from his name, it may be inferred that he was a Briton, whether a native of this island or of the Continent.")
- Saint Nathalan (Nachlan, Nauchlan), Bishop of Tullicht, Aberdeenshire, Scotland (678) (Note: Born of a wealthy family in Scotland, he became a hermit and was praised for earning his living by tilling the soil, 'which comes closest to divine contemplation'. He became a bishop and lived in Tullicht.)
- Saint Remigius, Bishop of Rouen, France from 755 onwards (772)
- Saint Arcontius, Bishop of Viviers, France, killed by a mob for having upheld the rights of the Church (c. 8th century)
- Saint Catellus (Castellus), Bishop of Castellamare to the south of Naples, Italy (9th century)

== Post-Schism Orthodox saints ==
- Venerable Cosmas of the Monastery of St. John Chrysostom, at Koutsovendis, Cyprus.
- Venerable Macarius the Faster of the Kiev Near Caves (12th century)
- Venerable Meletios the Confessor and Monk of Mount Galesios (1283)
- Venerable Macarius the Deacon of the Kiev Caves, Wonderworker (13th-14th century)
- Righteous Theodore the Fool for Christ of Novgorod (1392)
- Saint Mark Eugenikos, Archbishop of Ephesus, who resisted the Roman Catholic heresies (1444)
- Venerable Macarius the Roman of Novgorod, Abbot (1550)

=== New martyrs and confessors ===
- New Hieromartyr Peter Skipetrov, Archpriest of Petrograd (1918) (Note: See also: (in Russian) Скипетров, Пётр Иванович. Википедии. (Russian Wikipedia).) (see also: February 1 - N.S.)
- New Hieromartyr Nicholas Vostorgov, Priest (1930) (Note: See: (in Russian) Восторгов, Николай Евдокимович. Википедии. (Russian Wikipedia).)
- Martyr Theodore Gusev (1940)

== Other commemorations ==
- Commemoration of the miracle wrought by Saint Basil the Great at Nicaea, when by his prayer he opened the gates of the Universal (Catholic) church and entrusted it to the Orthodox.
- Translation of the relics (950) of Saint Gregory the Theologian (389)
- Opening of the relics (1652) of Saint Sabbas of Storozhev in Zvenigorod (1406)
- Repose of Schemanun Anatolia of Diveyevo Convent (1949)
- Commemoration of the 'Venerable Fathers, the Founders of Monasticism, and of All Saints Who Shone Forth in the Land of Egypt' (2025) (Note: The Holy Synod of the Russian Orthodox Church formally established a new feast honoring the monastic fathers and all saints who shone forth in Egypt. The decision was made following reports from Metropolitan Anthony of Volokolamsk, chairman of the Department for External Church Relations, and Bishop Pankraty of Troitsk, chairman of the Synodal Commission for the Canonization of Saints. The feast will include all saints who shone forth in Egypt who are included in the Russian Church’s calendar. It will be celebrated on January 19/February 1, the feast of St. Macarius the Great.) (Russian Orthodox Church)

== Icon gallery ==
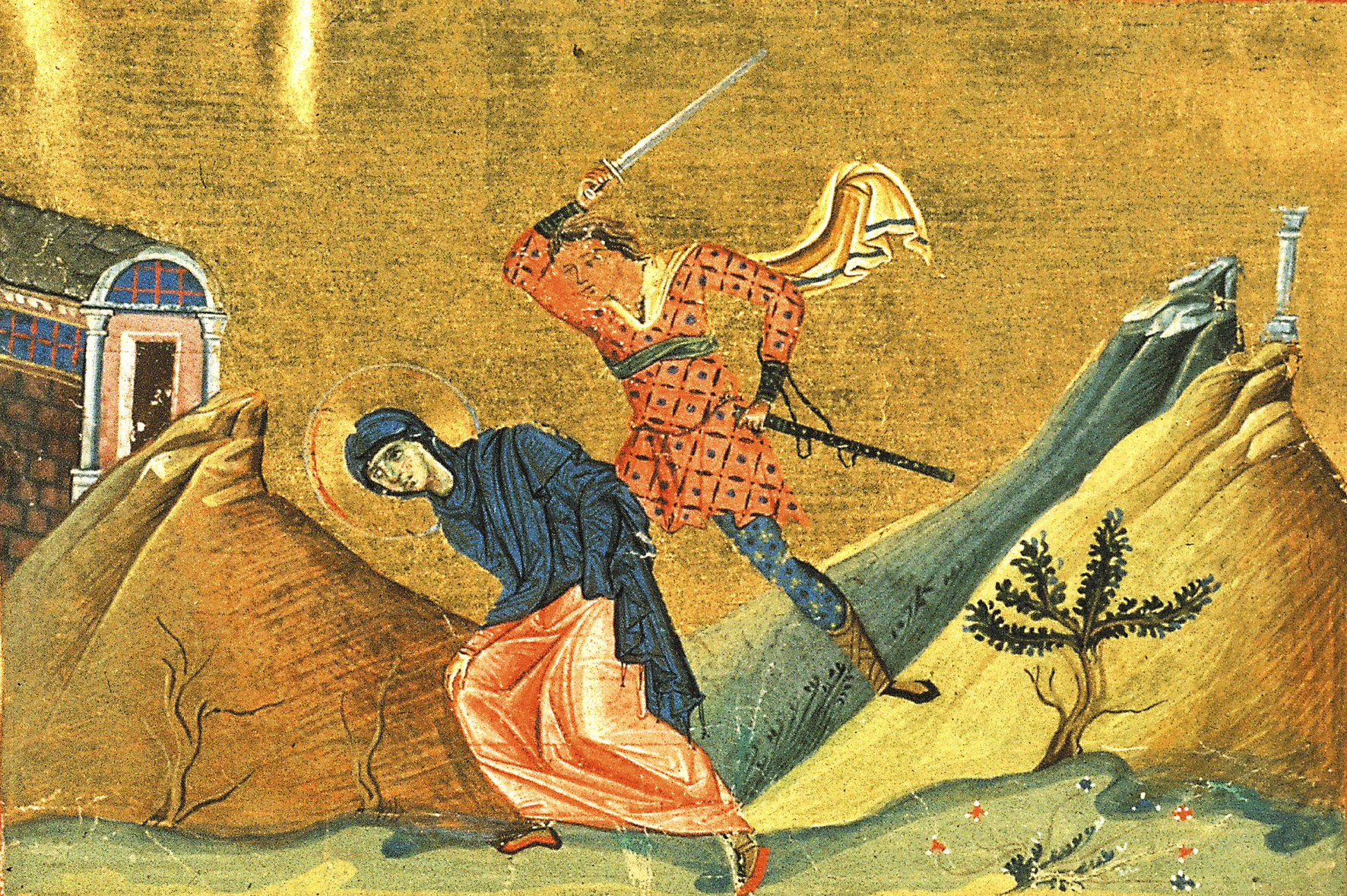
Virgin Martyr Euphrasia of Nicomedia.
(Menologion of Basil II, 10th century).

St. Theodotus, Bishop of Cyrene.
(Menologion of Basil II, 10th century).

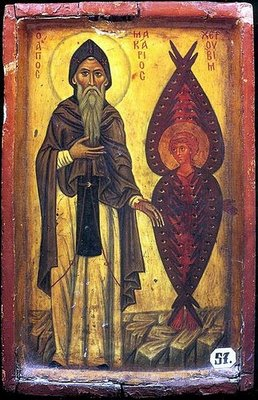
Venerable Macarius the Great of Egypt and the Cherubim.

St. Macarius the Roman of Mesopotamia (left), (Note: The feast day of Saint Macarius the Roman of Mesopotamia (c. 5th century) is on October 23.) and St. Macarius the Great of Egypt (right).
(Menologion of Basil II, 10th century).

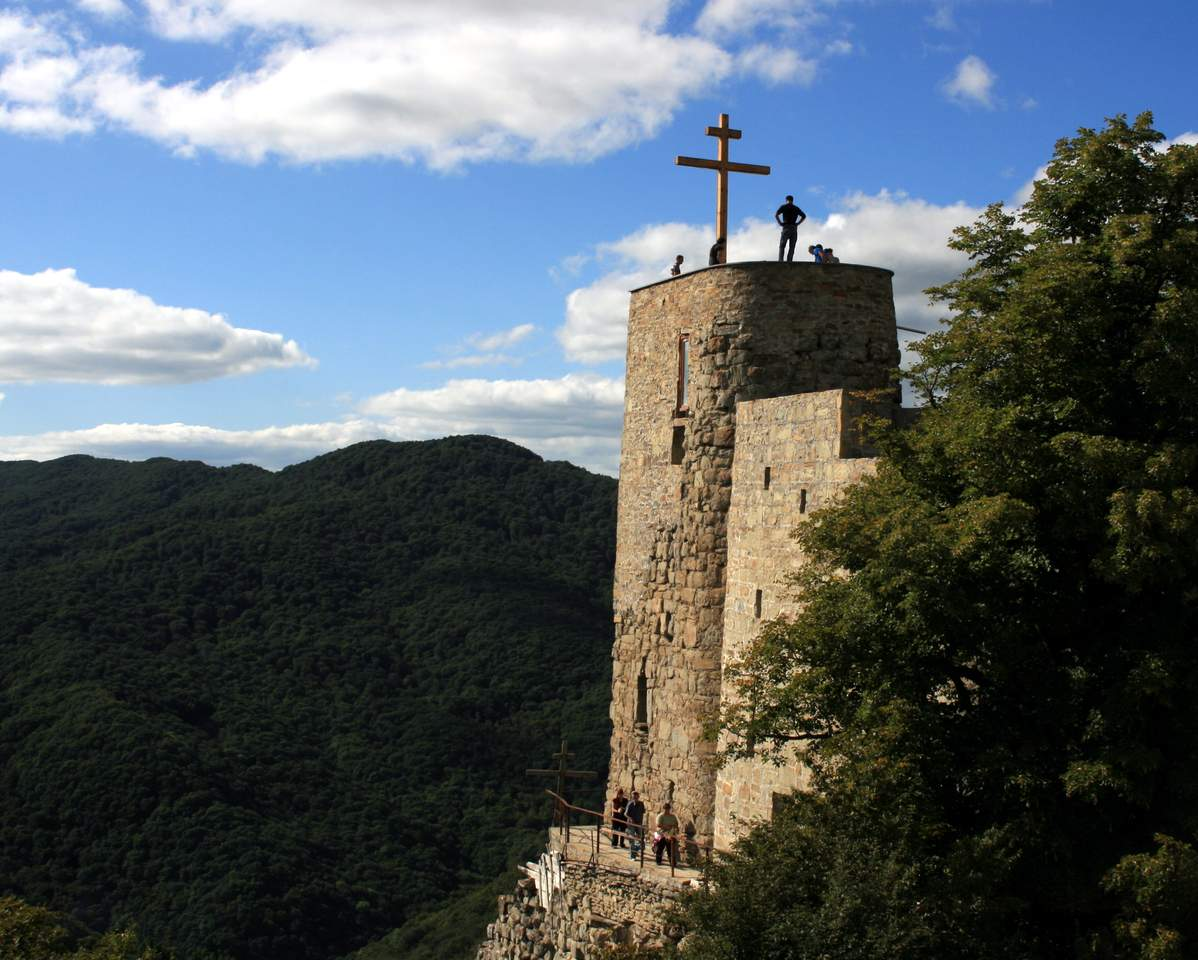
St. Anton's Tower, Martqopi Monastery, Georgia.

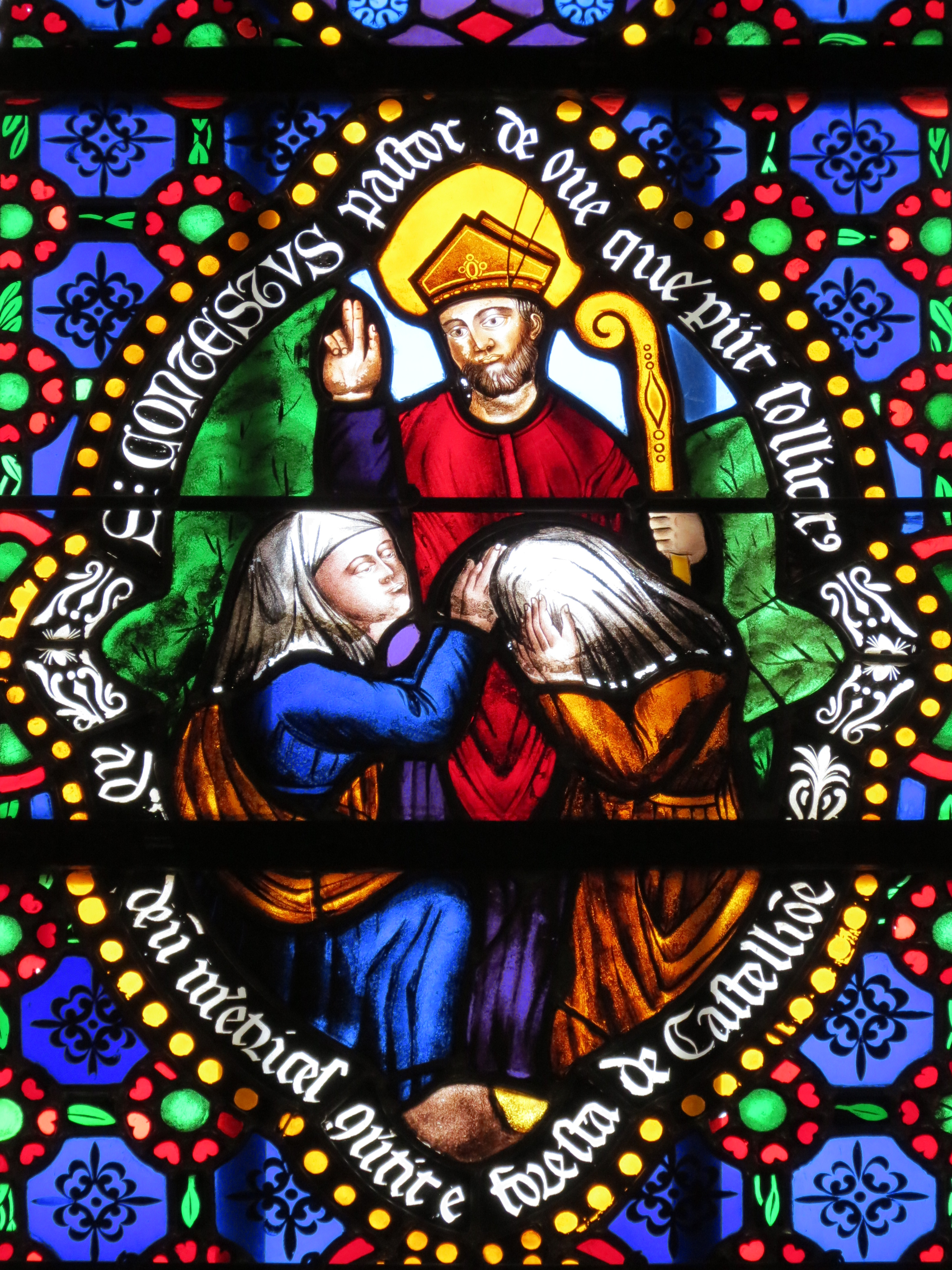
St. Contestus, Bishop of Bayeux.
(Stained glass window, 1839).

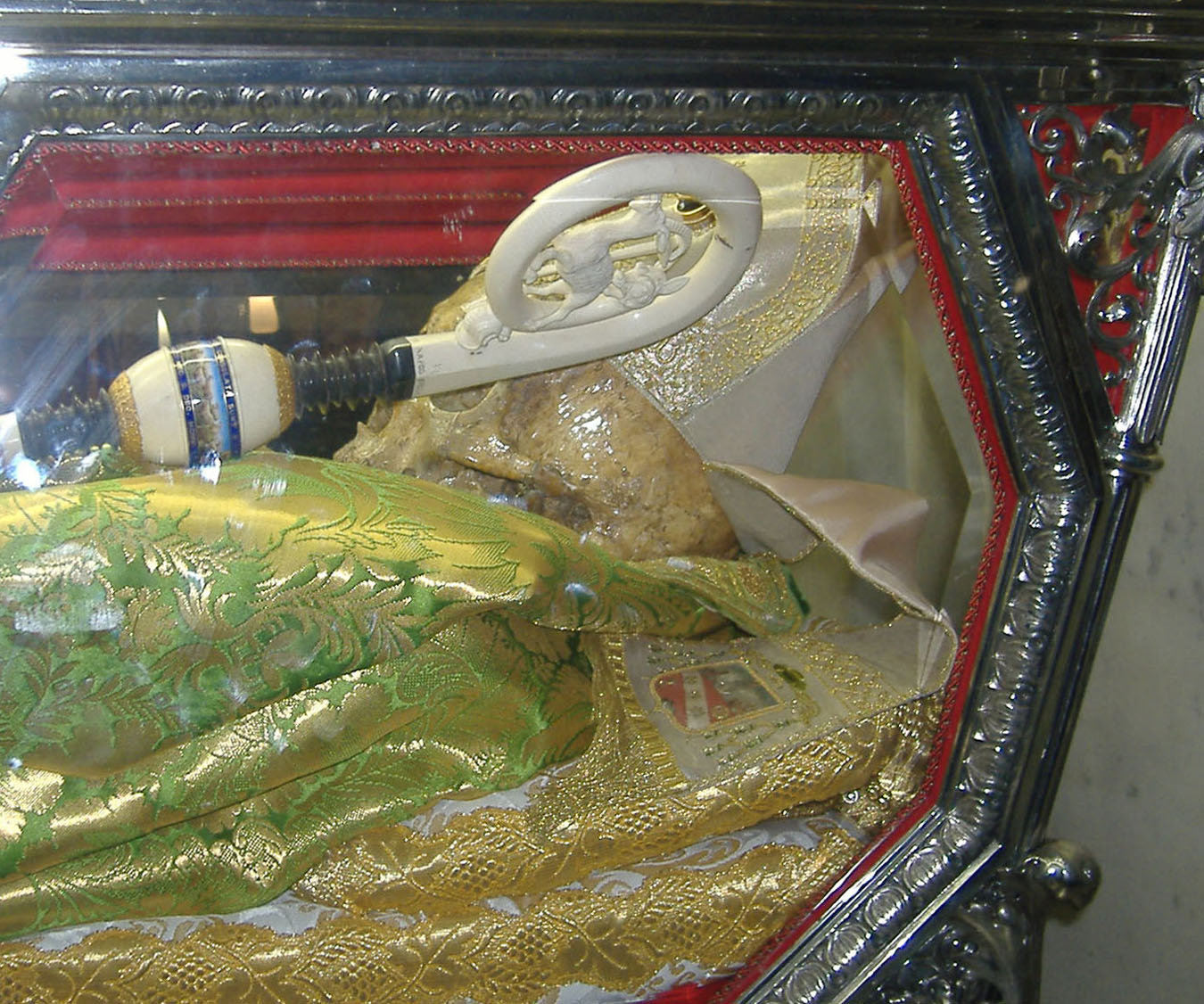
Relics of St. Bassian of Lodi, in Lodi's Cathedral Crypt, Italy.

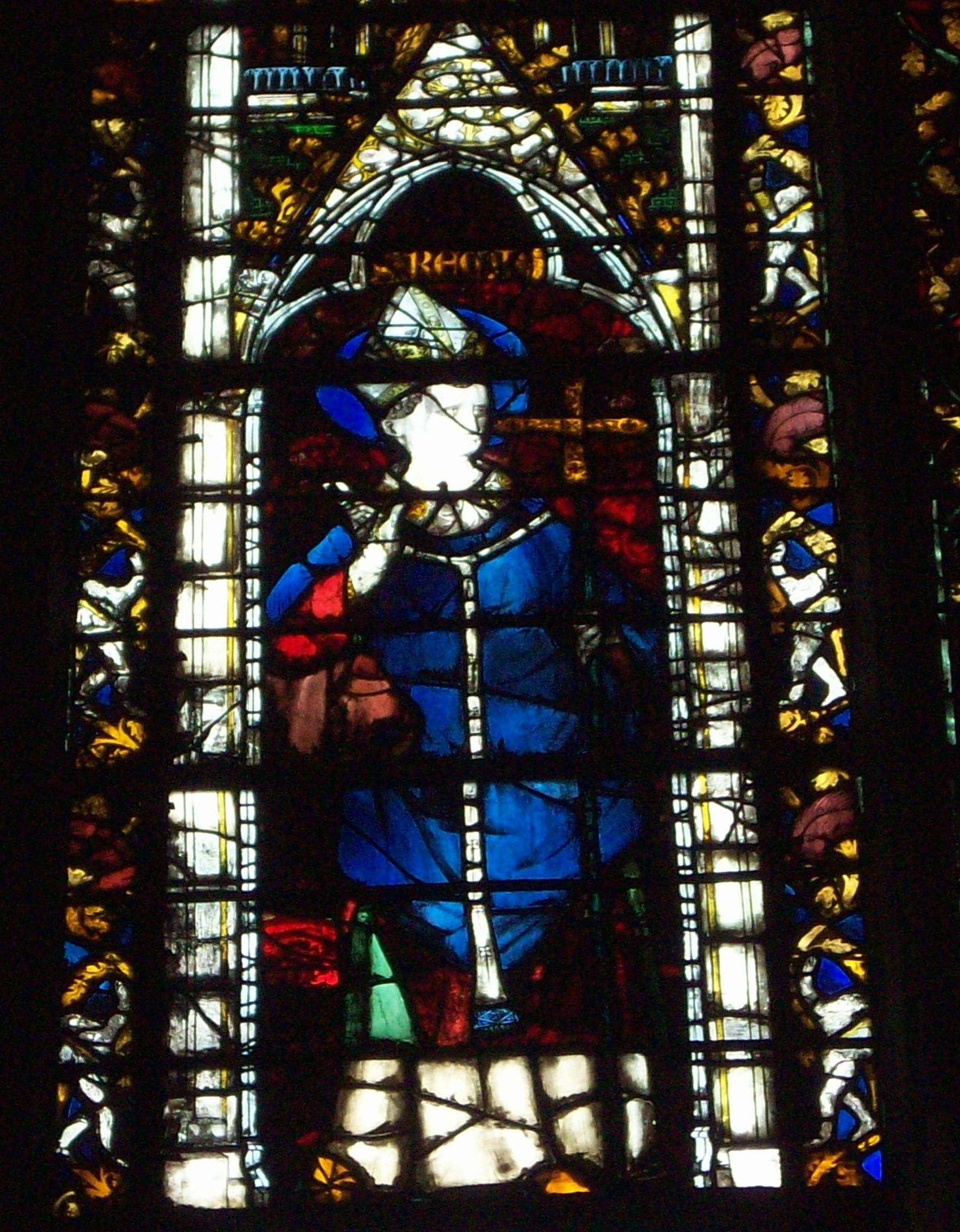
Saint Remigius of Rouen
(Stained glass, Cathedral of Notre-Dame in Rouen).

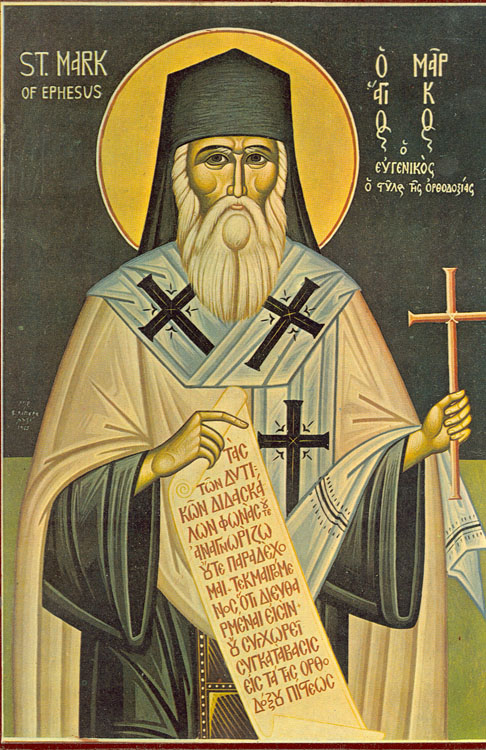
St. Mark Eugenikos of Ephesus.

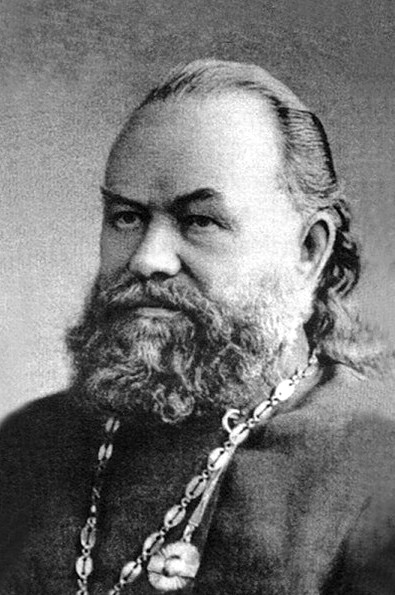
New Hieromartyr Peter Skipetrov, Archpriest of Petrograd.

== Sources ==
- January 19 / February 1. Orthodox Calendar (PRAVOSLAVIE.RU).
- February 1 / January 19. HOLY TRINITY RUSSIAN ORTHODOX CHURCH (A parish of the Patriarchate of Moscow).
- January 19. OCA - The Lives of the Saints.
- The Autonomous Orthodox Metropolia of Western Europe and the Americas (ROCOR). St. Hilarion Calendar of Saints for the year of our Lord 2004. St. Hilarion Press (Austin, TX). pp. 8–9.
- January 19. Latin Saints of the Orthodox Patriarchate of Rome.
- The Roman Martyrology. Transl. by the Archbishop of Baltimore. Last Edition, According to the Copy Printed at Rome in 1914. Revised Edition, with the Imprimatur of His Eminence Cardinal Gibbons. Baltimore: John Murphy Company, 1916. pp. 19–20.
- Rev. Richard Stanton. A Menology of England and Wales, or, Brief Memorials of the Ancient British and English Saints Arranged According to the Calendar, Together with the Martyrs of the 16th and 17th Centuries. London: Burns & Oates, 1892. p. 25.

Greek Sources

- Great Synaxaristes: (in Greek) 19 ΙΑΝΟΥΑΡΙΟΥ. ΜΕΓΑΣ ΣΥΝΑΞΑΡΙΣΤΗΣ.
- (in Greek) Συναξαριστής. 19 Ιανουαρίου. ECCLESIA.GR. (H ΕΚΚΛΗΣΙΑ ΤΗΣ ΕΛΛΑΔΟΣ).

Russian Sources

- (in Russian) 1 февраля (19 января). Православная Энциклопедия под редакцией Патриарха Московского и всея Руси Кирилла (электронная версия). (Orthodox Encyclopedia - Pravenc.ru).
- (in Russian) 19 января (ст.ст.) 1 февраля 2014 (нов. ст.). Русская Православная Церковь Отдел внешних церковных связей. (DECR).
