= Pope Zacharias of Alexandria =

Head of the Coptic Church from 1004 to 1032

Saint Zacharias of Alexandria
- Pope of Alexandria and Patriarch of the See of St. Mark
- Papacy began: 1004
- Papacy ended: 22 November 1032
- Predecessor: Philotheus
- Successor: Shenouda II

Personal details
- Born: Alexandria, Egypt
- Died: 22 November 1032
- Buried: Church of the Holy Virgin (Babylon El-Darag)
- Denomination: Coptic Orthodox Christian
- Residence: Saint Mark's Church

Sainthood
- Feast day: 22 November (13 Hathor in the Coptic calendar)

Pope Zacharias of Alexandria, was the 64th Pope of Alexandria and Patriarch of the See of St. Mark.

He was a native of Alexandria and was an ordained priest there. He was chaste and gentle in disposition.

During his time as pope, Zacharias spent three months in prison and nine years in the desert.

According to Abu al-Makarim, writing in the last quarter of the twelfth century, Zacharias was the last Patriarch of Alexandria to send letters to the rulers of Nubia and Ethiopia, having been forbidden to do so by the Fatimid Caliph Al-Hakim bi-Amr Allah. Nevertheless, if the Caliph or his vizier received a letter from either ruler, it remained the duty of the Patriarch to write a reply.

Pope Zacharias was buried in Saint Mary Church (Babylon Al-Darag) in Coptic Cairo.

His feast day is 13 Hatur.

Preceded by Philotheos	Coptic Pope; 1004–1032	Succeeded by Shenouda II
