= Pope Shenouda II of Alexandria =

Head of the Coptic Church from 1032 to 1046

- Pope of Alexandria and Patriarch of the See of St. Mark
- Papacy began: 1032
- Papacy ended: 1046
- Predecessor: Zacharias
- Successor: Christodolos

Personal details
- Born: Egypt
- Died: 1046 Egypt
- Buried: Damrua
- Denomination: Coptic Orthodox Christian
- Residence: Saint Mark's Church

Pope Shenouda II of Alexandria was the 65th Pope of Alexandria and Patriarch of the See of St. Mark.

He was Pope from 1032 to 1046.

Preceded by Zacharias	Coptic Pope; 1032–1046	Succeeded by Christodolos
