= February 1 (Eastern Orthodox liturgics) =

Day in the Eastern Orthodox liturgical calendar

Eastern Orthodox liturgical calendar
January 31	February 1	February 2
February 1 O.S. ≍ February 14 N.S. February 1 N.S ≍ January 19 O.S.

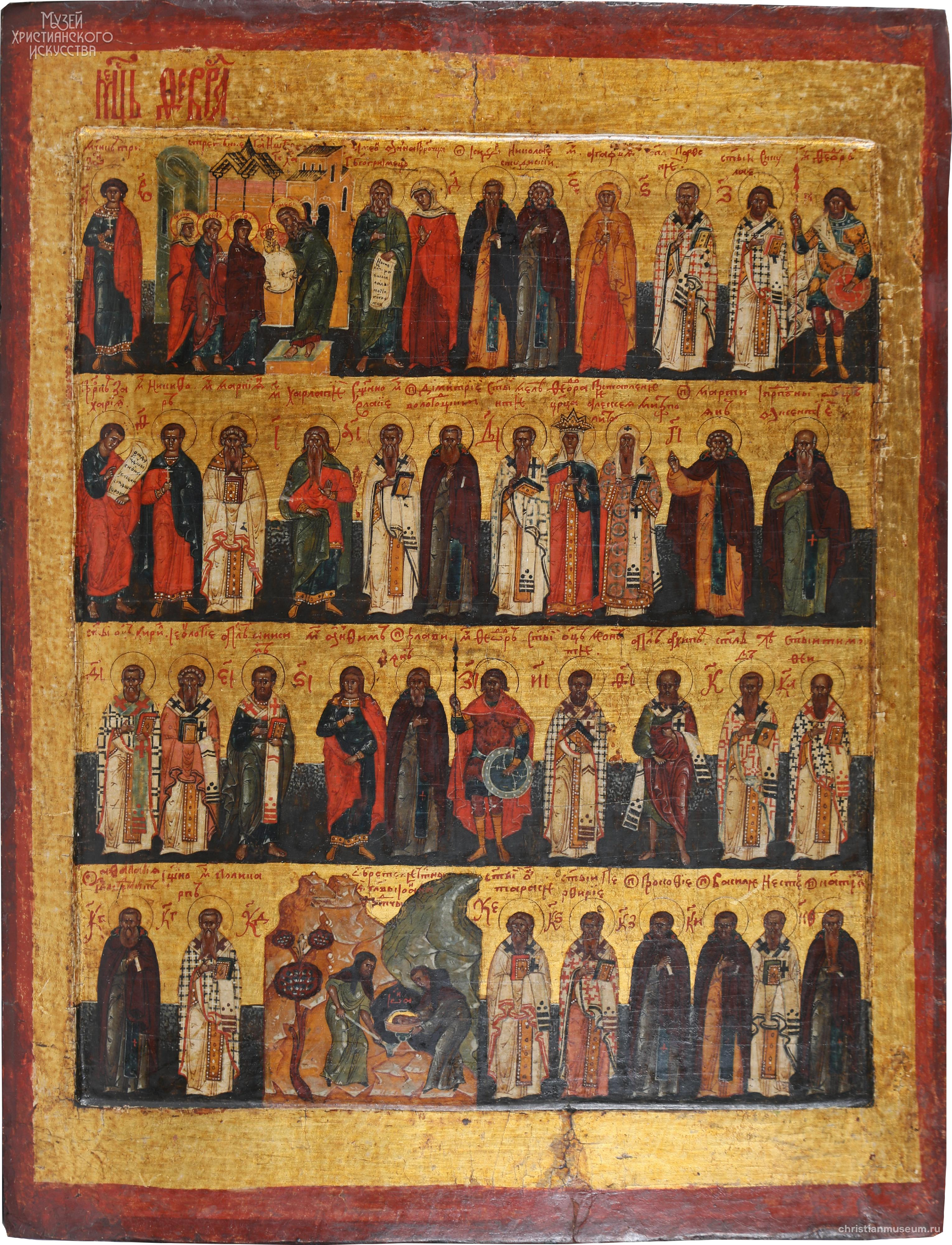
Menaion calendar icon - February.

February 1 in Eastern Orthodox liturgical calendars is a feast day and a day of commemoration of saints and martyrs. Although some Orthodox churches use the Revised Julian Calendar and others use the traditional Julian calendar, the fixed commemorations for their respective February 1 are broadly the same, no matter which calendar is used. (Note: Despite the dates being the same, the days to which they refer typically differ by 13 days. The notation Old Style or O.S. is sometimes used to indicate a date in the traditional Julian Calendar (the "Old Calendar"). The notation New Style or N.S, indicates a date in the Revised Julian calendar (the "New Calendar").)

== Feasts ==
- Forefeast of the Meeting of our Lord in the Temple.

== Saints ==
- Martyr Tryphon of Campsada near Apamea in Syria (250)
- Martyr Theonas, with Two Children.
- Martyr Karion.
- Venerable Peter of Galatia, hermit near Antioch in Syria (429) (Note: This St. Peter should not be confused with the other St. Peter of Galatia (9th century), who is commemorated on October 9.) (see also: November 25)
- Venerable Vendemanius (Bendemanius), hermit of Bithynia (512)
- Saint Anthony the Hermit, in Georgia (6th century)
- Great-martyr Elijah of Heliopolis, (Elias the New, of Damascus) (779)
- Saints David (784), Symeon (843), and George (844), Confessors of Mytilene.
- Saint Basil I the Confessor, Archbishop of Thessalonica (862)
- Saint Basil II the Synaxaristis, Archbishop of Thessalonica (c. 904)
- Saint Timothy the Confessor.

== Pre-Schism Western saints ==
- Martyrs Perpetua of Carthage, and the catechumens Satyrus, Revocatus, Saturninus, Secundus, and Felicity, at Carthage (202-203) (Note: "O GOD, who among the manifold works of thine almighty power hast bestowed even upon the weakness of women strength to win the victory of martyrdom: grant, we beseech thee, that we, who on this day recall the heavenly birth of blessed Perpetua and Felicity, thy Martyrs, may so follow in their footsteps, that we may likewise attain unto thee. Through Christ our Lord. Amen.") (see also: March 7 - West)
- Saint Severus, Bishop of Ravenna, attended the Council of Sardica in 344 (348) (Note: "At Ravenna, the holy bishop Severus, whose great virtues deserved that he should be raised to the episcopate by the sign of a dove.")
- Saint Paul of Trois-Châteaux, Bishop of Trois-Châteaux in the Dauphiné (c. 405) (Note: "At Trois-Chateaux, in France, St. Paul, bishop, whose life was eminent for virtues, and whose death was made precious by miracles.")
- Venerable Brigid of Kildare (524) (Note: "In Ireland, St. Bridget, virgin. One day, at her touch, the wood of an altar immediately sprouted into life, in testimony of her virginity.")
- Saint Darlugdach of Kildare (Derlugdacha), successor of St Brigid as second Abbess of Kildare in Ireland (c. 524)
- Saint Ursus of Aosta, born in Ireland, he preached against Arianism in the south of France and later went to Aosta in Italy (6th century)
- Saint Seiriol, Abbot of Penmon Priory, Anglesey (6th century) (see also: January 2)
- Saint Sigebert III, King of Austrasia (656)
- Saint Severus of Avranches, Abbot and Bishop of Avranches (c. 690)
- Saint Brigid the Younger, sister of St Andrew the Scot, Abbot of St. Donatus in Fiesole in Tuscany in Italy (9th century)
- Saint Clarus of Seligenstadt, ascetic and hermit (c. 1048)

== Post-Schism Orthodox saints ==
- Saint Tryphon, Bishop of Rostov (1468)
- New Martyr Anastasius of Nauplion (1655)
- The Four Martyrs of Megara: Polyeuctos, George, Adrianos and Platon, the "Newly-Revealed" (1754, 1998) (Note: The year and manner of martyrdom of the Holy Martyrs Adrianos, Polyeuctos, Platon, and George are unknown. But we do know the wondrous manner in which the relics of these holy martyrs were found by the grace of God in Megara. In the year 1754, a cleric named Oikonomos (which could have something to do with being "Oikonomos" of the Patriarch of Jerusalem) wanted to build a house. When the workers of the community were digging and constructing the foundations, one of them claimed that he felt an intense heat at his feet, and indicated that he couldn't keep working. The Oikonomos put his hands in the spot, and paradoxically felt the same heat as the worker. The rest of the workers, however, kept digging until they hit a marble slab with the following inscription on it: (in Greek) "Λείψανα Μαρτύρων. Αδριανός, Πολύευκτος, Πλάτων, Γεώργιος" - [The relics of the Martyrs Adrianos, Polyeuctos, Platon, George].; Lifting up the plaque, he found the all-holy relics of the Holy Four Martyrs, and he glorified God for the heavenly blessing and consolation which he granted to them. In the place where the relics were found, further excavations revealed a large Early Christian Basilica which dates from the mid-5th to the 6th century AD, and which was built in honor of the Four Holy Martyrs. Further excavations in 1998 uncovered more of their holy relics, which were placed in a beautiful reliquary and are honored joyously by the faithful.)

=== New martyrs and confessors ===
- New Hieromartyr Peter Skipetrov, Archpriest, of Petrograd (1918) (see also: January 19)
- New Hieromartyr Nicholas Mezentsev, Archpriest, of Simferopol (1938)

== Other commemorations ==
- Icon of the Mother of God "Sokolsky" (1854) (Note: Austrian soldiers occupied the district of Moldavia during the Crimean War, causing great hardship for its inhabitants. The Sokolsky Monastery, a center of spiritual life for a hundred years, was suppressed and its monks were scattered. The seminary along with the Sokolsky Icon moved to another location.)

== Icon gallery ==
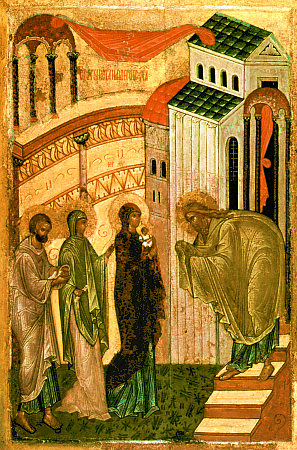
Meeting of the Lord. Russian Orthodox icon, 15th century

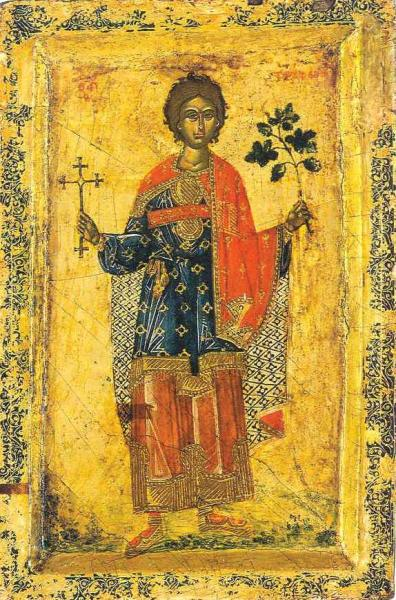
Martyr Tryphon of Campsada.

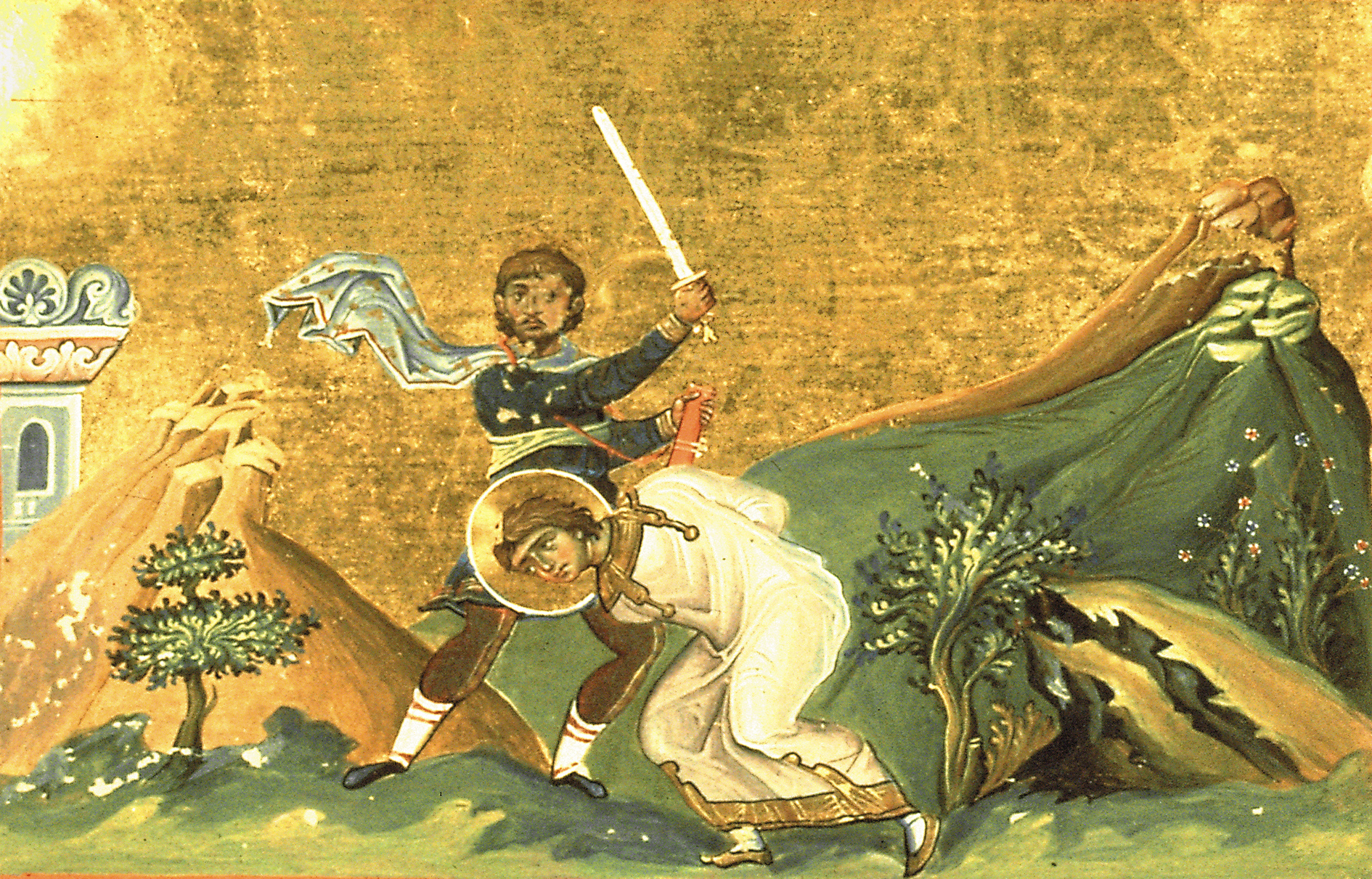
Martyr Tryphon of Campsada (Menologion of Basil II, 10th century).

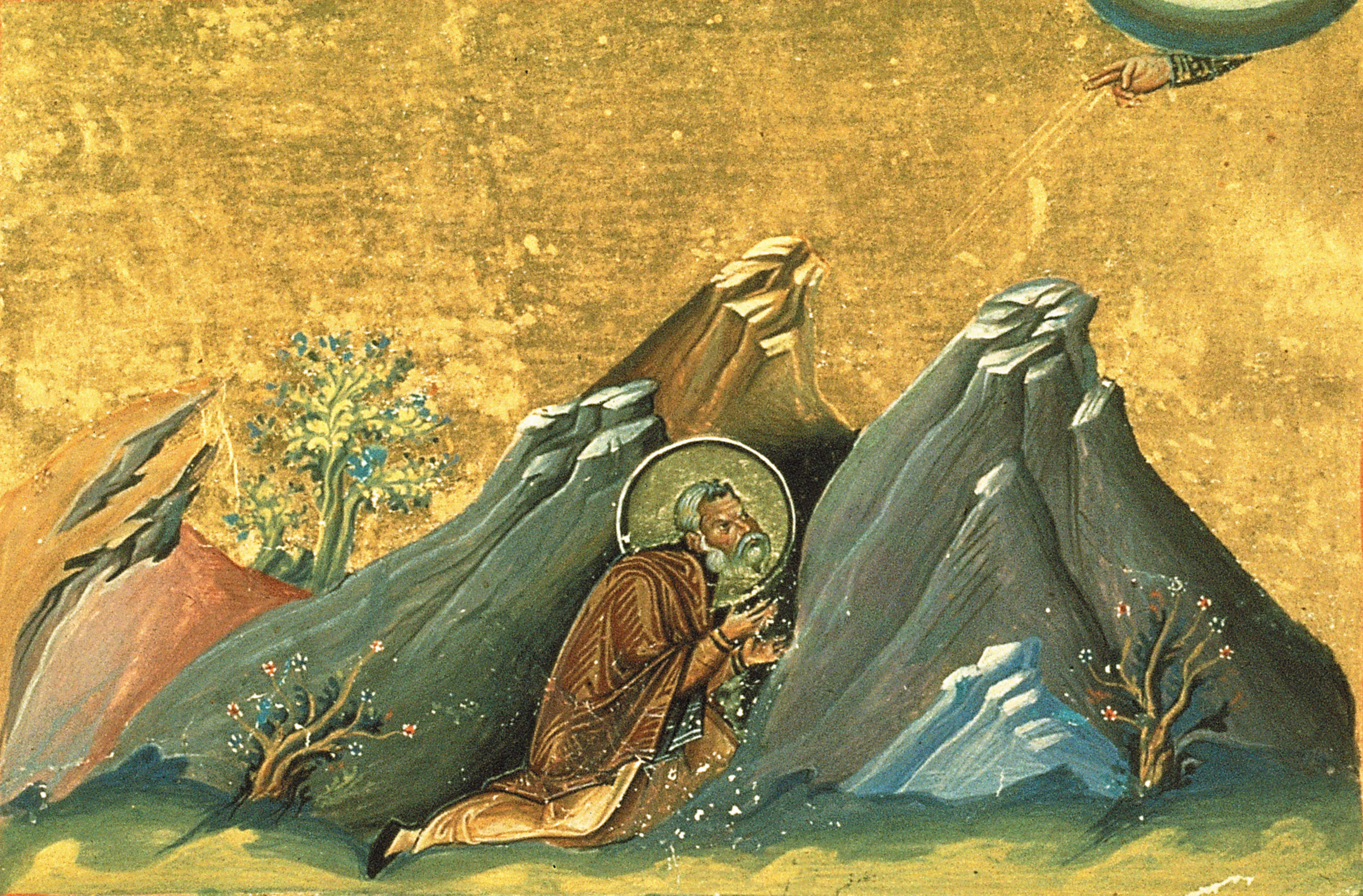
Venerable Vendemanius, hermit of Bithynia (Menologion of Basil II, 10th century).

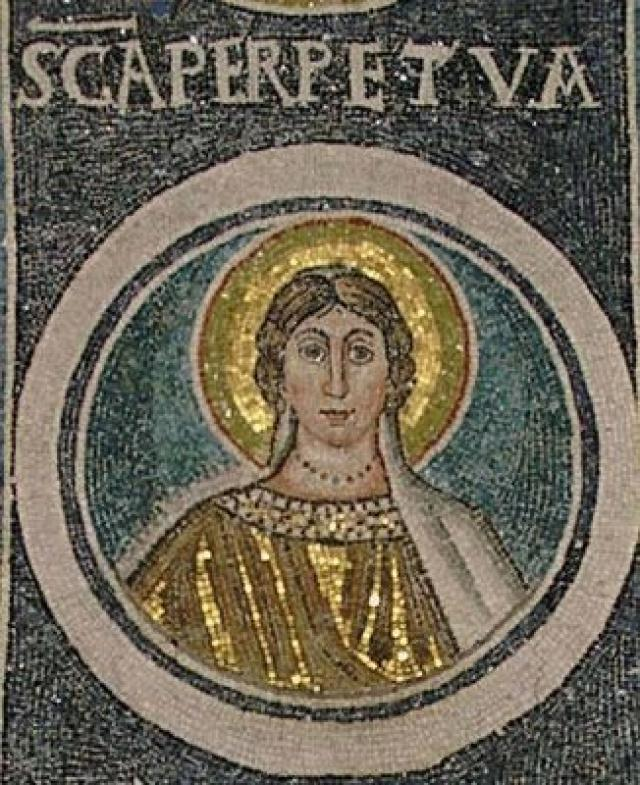
St. Perpetua of Carthage, mosaic, c. 1280.

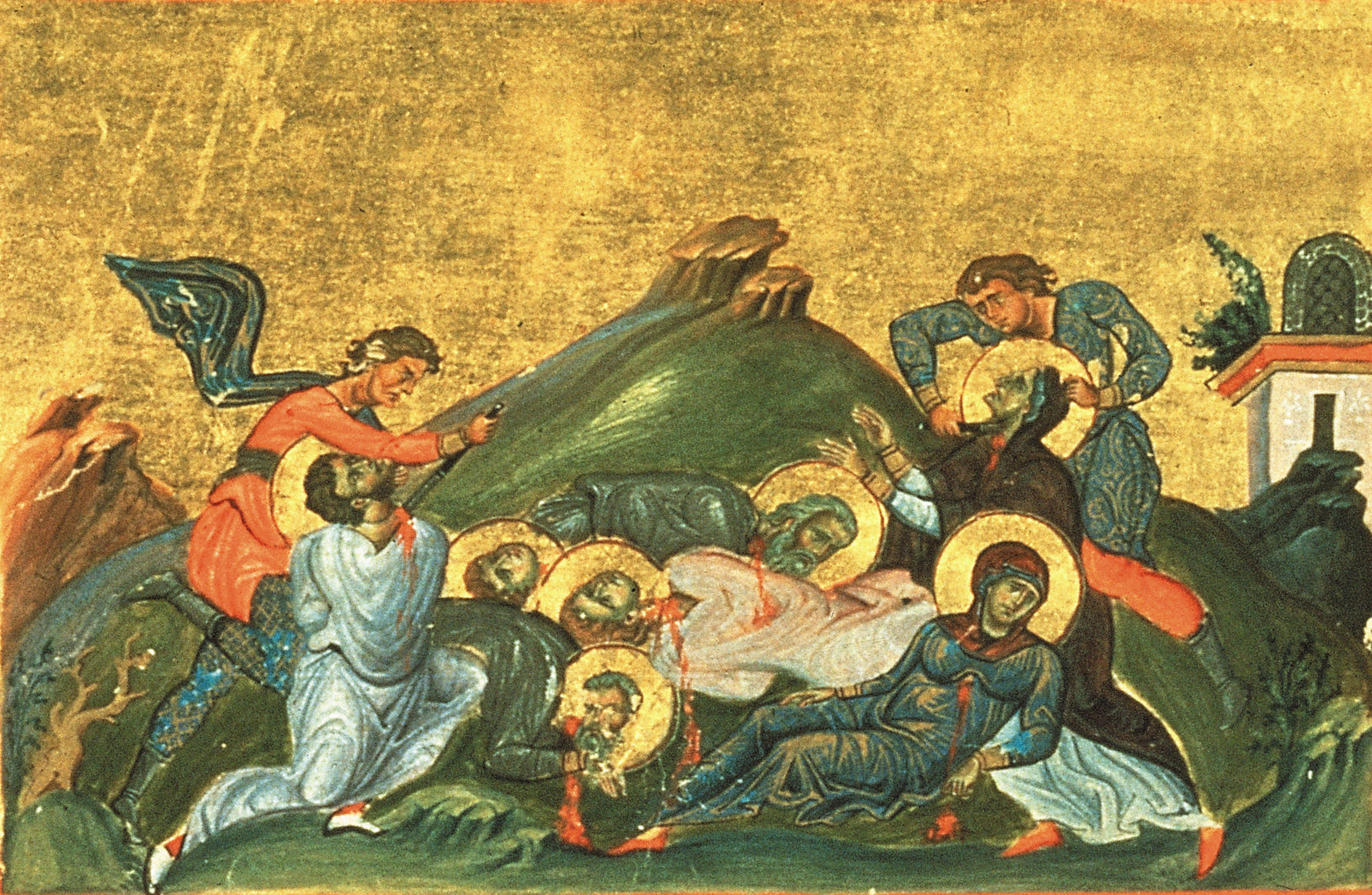
Sts. Martyrs Perpetua of Carthage, and catechumens Saturus, Revocatus, Saturninus, Secundulus, and Felicitas at Carthage (Menologion of Basil II, (c. 985)).

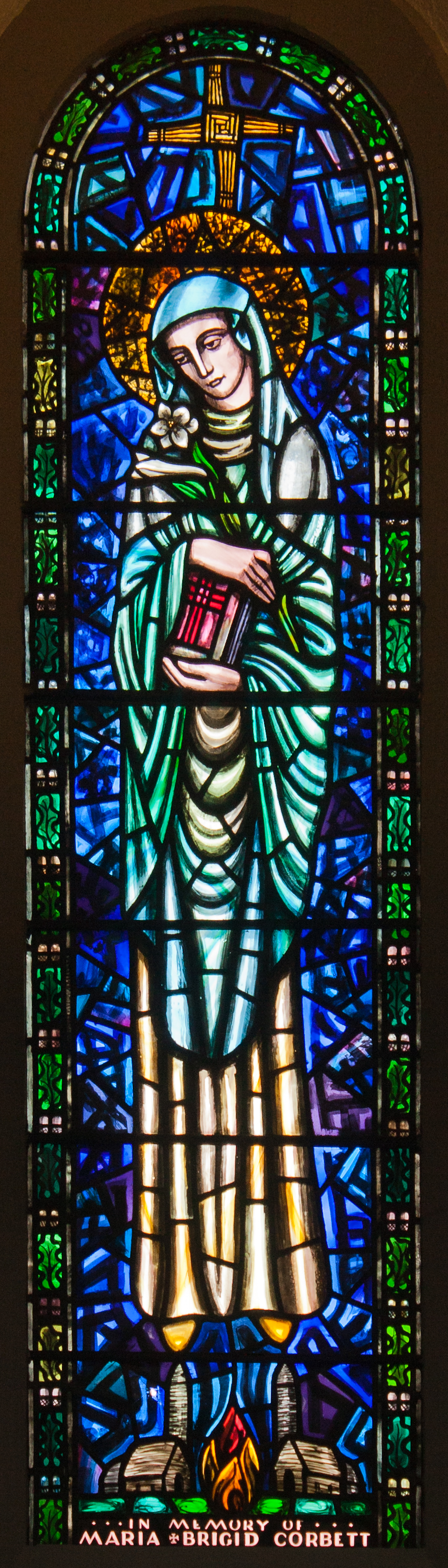
St Brigit of Kildare, stained glass.

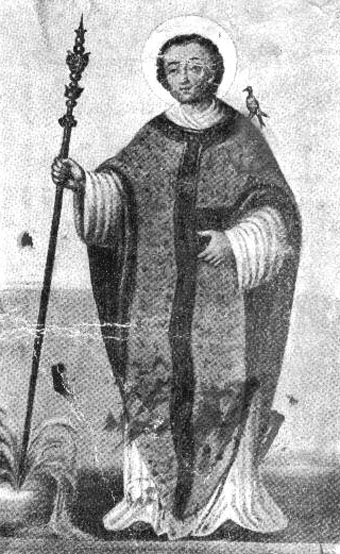
St. Ursus of Aosta.

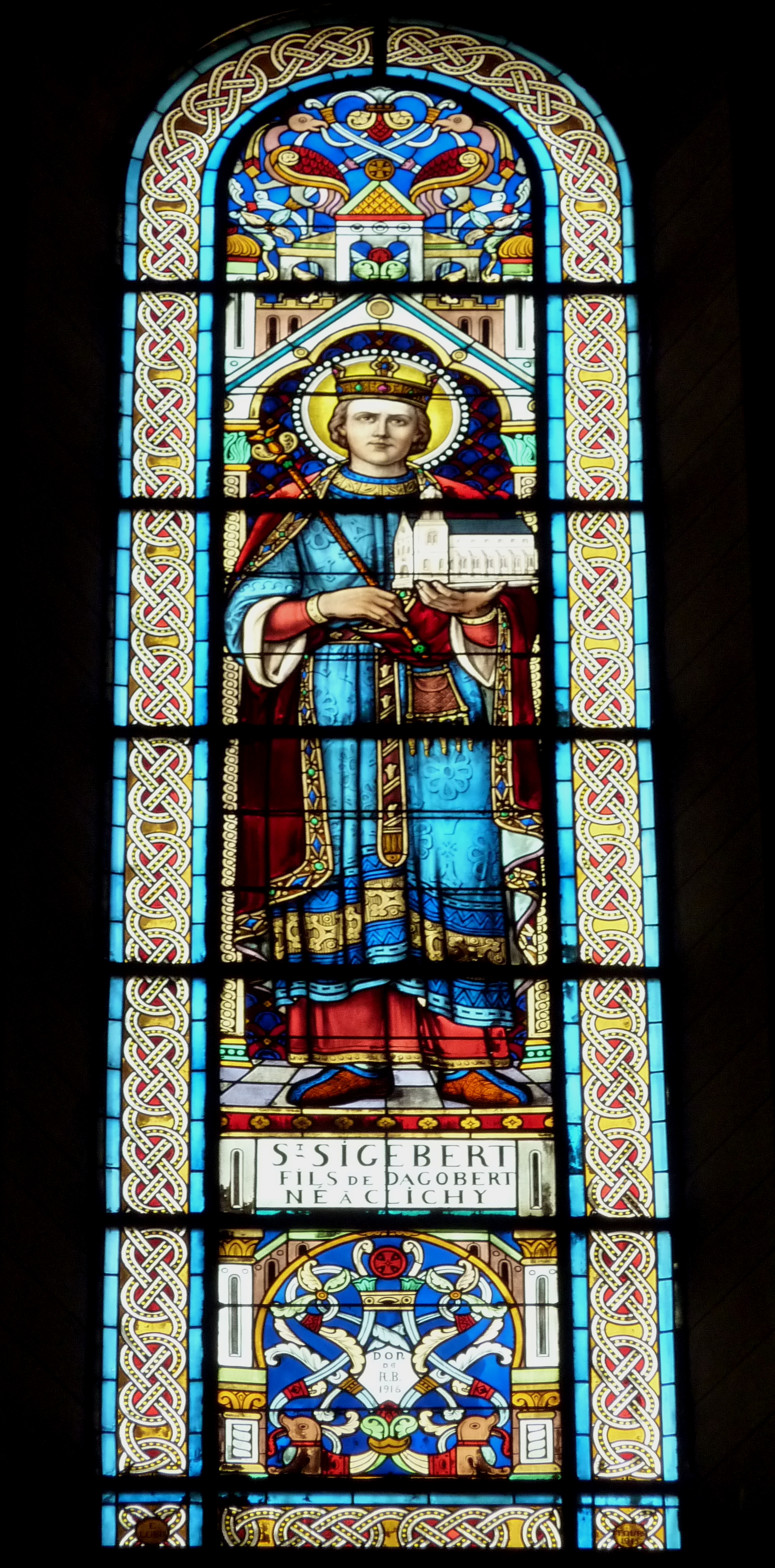
St. Sigebert III, stained glass window.

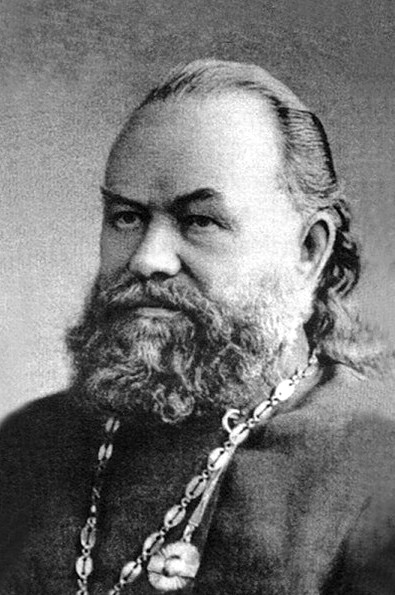
New Hieromartyr Peter Skipetrov, Archpriest of Petrograd.

== Sources ==
- February 1/14. Orthodox Calendar (pravoslavie.ru).
- February 14 / February 1. Holy Trinity Russian Orthodox CHurch (A Parish of the Patriarchate of Moscow).
- February 1. OCA - The Lives of the Saints.
- February 1. Latin Saints of the Orthodox Patriarchate of Rome.
- The Roman Martyrology. Transl. by the Archbishop of Baltimore. Last Edition, According to the Copy Printed at Rome in 1914. Revised Edition, with the Imprimatur of His Eminence Cardinal Gibbons. Baltimore: John Murphy Company, 1916. pp. 34–35.
- Rev. Richard Stanton. A Menology of England and Wales, or, Brief Memorials of the Ancient British and English Saints Arranged According to the Calendar, Together with the Martyrs of the 16th and 17th Centuries. London: Burns & Oates, 1892. pp. 44–46.

Greek Sources

- Great Synaxaristes: (in Greek) 1 Φεβρουαριου. Μεγασ Συναξαριστησ.
- (in Greek) Συναξαριστής. 1 Φεβρουαρίου. Ecclesia.gr. (H Εκκλησια τησ Ελλαδοσ).

Russian Sources

- (in Russian) 14 февраля (1 февраля). Православная Энциклопедия под редакцией Патриарха Московского и всея Руси Кирилла (электронная версия). (Orthodox Encyclopedia - Pravenc.ru).
- (in Russian) 1 февраля (ст.ст.) 14 февраля 2013 (нов. ст.). Русская Православная Церковь Отдел внешних церковных связей. (Decr).
- (in Russian) 1 февраля по старому стилю / 14 февраля по новому стилю. Русская Православная Церковь - Православный церковный календарь на 2018 год.
