= Maximus and Domatius =

4th-century Roman noblemen

Saints Maximus and Domatius

Saints, Monks
- Born: c. 4 AD; Rome, Roman Empire
- Died: 380 AD; Wadi El Natrun, Egypt
- Venerated in: Coptic Orthodox Church, Syriac Orthodox Church, Eastern Orthodox Church
- Major shrine: Church built by Saint Macarius in Scetes
- Feast: Tobi 14 (Maximus), 17 (Domatius); 9 January (Syriac Orthodox)

Maximus and Domatius were Roman noblemen who embraced monasticism in the 4th century. They are venerated as saints in the Coptic Orthodox Church, Syriac Orthodox Church, and are venerated in the Eastern Orthodox Church. Their commitment to ascetic life and association with Macarius the Great contributed to the early development of Christian monasticism in Egypt.

== Life ==
Maximus and Domatius were the sons of Walendianus, a Roman governor and devout Christian. Desiring a deeper spiritual life, they asked their father to send them to Nicaea to pray at the site of the First Council of Nicaea. He agreed, providing an escort, which the brothers dismissed upon arrival to begin their life of seclusion and prayer.

There they met a monk named Hanna who guided them to Syria, where they studied under a monk called Aghabus. Before his death, Aghabus reportedly had a vision instructing them to go to Egypt and join Macarius in the desert of Scetes.

At that time, Emperor Theodosius I sought to appoint Maximus as Patriarch of Constantinople, but the brothers rejected worldly honor and fled to Egypt. There they met Macarius, who received them warmly and helped them build a modest cell. They led a silent, isolated life of prayer and manual labor, interacting only with Macarius to receive the Eucharist.

Macarius later testified that one night, while observing them from a distance, he saw them radiant with divine light and guarded by an angel bearing a fiery sword, and he cried out, "Pray for me, holy ones!"

== Death ==
Maximus was the first to fall seriously ill. As he lay dying, he prayed, asking for divine light and strength. It is said that a vision of saints, including John the Baptist and Emperor Constantine, appeared before he died on 14 Tobi.

Domatius, heartbroken, prayed for the same fate. Three days later, on 17 Tobi, he too died. Macarius, while approaching their cave, suddenly declared, "Domatius has departed," having seen a vision of his soul being carried to heaven.

Macarius buried them in their own cell and later built a church on the site — the first church in the desert of Scetes. The two brothers are regarded as the first monks to die in that wilderness.

== Veneration ==
Maximus and Domatius are commemorated on 14 and 17 Tobi (Coptic calendar) by the Coptic Church. The Syriac Orthodox Church observes their memory on 9 January.

Some Byzantine sources briefly mention a monastic Maximos associated with Scetis, though it is not always clear whether this refers to the same Maximus.

== Legacy ==
Their story exemplifies the early ideals of Christian monasticism: renunciation of worldly honors, obedience, solitude, and communion with God. Their names continue to be revered in Eastern and Oriental Christian traditions.
