= Health issues during the 2010 Copiapó mining accident =

The 2010 Copiapó mining accident began as a cave-in on 5 August 2010 at the San José copper-gold mine in the Atacama Desert near Copiapó, Chile. The accident left 33 men trapped 700 meters (2,300 ft) below ground who survived underground for a record 69 days. All 33 men were rescued and brought to the surface on 13 October 2010 over a period of almost 24 hours. After the last trapped miner was winched to the surface, the rescue workers still underground held up a sign before the camera stating "Misión cumplida Chile" (English: "Mission accomplished Chile") to the estimated more than 1 billion people watching the rescue on live television around the world.

The San José Mine is about 45 kilometers (28 mi) north of Copiapó, in northern Chile. The miners were trapped approximately 5 kilometers (3 mi) from the mine entrance. The mine had a history of instability that had led to previous accidents, including one death.

The retrieval of the first miner, Florencio Ávalos, began on Tuesday, 12 October at 23:55 CLDT, with the rescue capsule reaching the surface 16 minutes later. Less than 24 hours later, at 21:55 CLDT on 13 October, all 33 miners had been rescued, almost all in good medical condition, and expected to recover fully. Two miners were suffering from silicosis, one of whom also had pneumonia, and others were suffering from dental infections and corneal problems. Three of the rescued miners had immediate surgery under general anesthesia for dental problems.

== Health of the trapped miners ==
On 23 August, voice contact was made with the miners. They reported having few medical problems; the doctor in charge of the rescue operation told the media that "they have considerably less discomfort than we might have expected after spending 18 days inside the mine, at 700 meters (2,300 ft) deep and under high temperatures and high humidity". The doctors also reported that the miners had already been provided with a 5% glucose solution and a drug to prevent stomach ulcers resulting from food deprivation. Material was sent down in 5-foot-long (1.5 m) blue plastic capsules nicknamed palomas ("doves", referring to the role of carrier pigeons), taking an hour to reach the miners. Engineers coated the boreholes with a gel in order to ensure the integrity of the shafts and ease the passage of the capsules. In addition to high-energy glucose gels, rehydration tablets, and medicine, rescuers also sent down oxygen after the miners reported there was not enough air. Delivery of solid food began a few days later. Two other boreholes were completed—one for oxygen enriched air, the second for videoconference equipment to allow daily video chats with family members. Relatives were permitted to write letters, but were asked to keep them optimistic.

Out of concern for the miners' morale, rescuers hesitated to tell them that according to the conservative plan, the rescue might take months, with an eventual extraction date close to Christmas. The miners who had been trapped since August would miss many events, including the Chilean Bicentennial celebrations and important soccer games, in addition to their personal anniversaries. The miners were fully informed, however, on 25 August, of the projected timeline for their rescue and the complexity of the plans to get them out. The mining minister reported that the men took the potentially negative news very well.

Rescue workers and consultants described the miners as a very disciplined group. Psychologists and doctors worked with the rescue effort to ensure the miners were kept busy and mentally focused. Fluorescent lights with timers were sent down to keep the men on a normal schedule by imitating day and night. The miners affirmed their ability to participate in rescue efforts, saying "There are a large number of professionals who are going to help in the rescue efforts from down here." Psychologists believed that the miners should have a role in their own destiny as it was important to maintain motivation and optimism. They divided themselves into three eight-hour shifts with each shift responsible for handling the palomas, environmental safety, preventing further rock falls, communications and sanitation-related tasks. Luis Urzúa became the overall leader and the oldest miner, Mario Gómez, was chosen to provide spiritual guidance. Mental health experts supported the hierarchical structure to preserve order and routine within the group believing it to be crucial to their mental health.

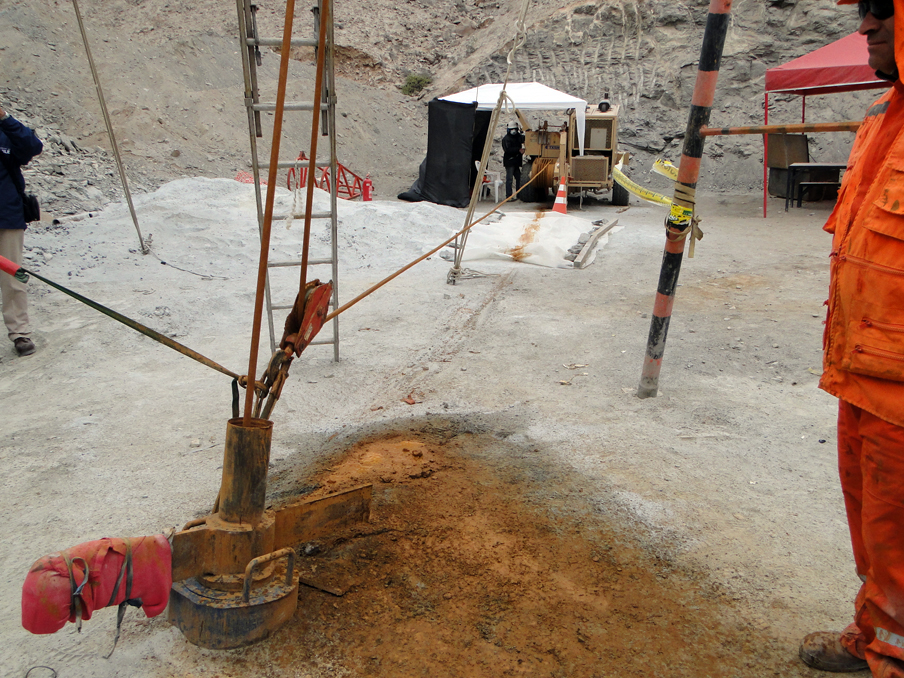
One of the two tubes used to deliver supplies to the miners 2,000ft below

Doctors determined that Yonni Barrios was the most qualified of the miners to undertake medical tasks and to communicate on health issues, due to his previous medical training. He made daily rounds, administering diagnostic tests, taking samples and updating patient charts, and participated in daily conference calls with the medical team above. He became so busy that he recruited Daniel Herrera to assist with the record-keeping. Barrios vaccinated the group against tetanus, diphtheria, flu and pneumonia. Many of the miners developed severe skin problems due to the hot and wet conditions. They were sent quick-drying clothing and mats so they would not have to sleep directly on the ground. In September, they received first aid kits, which included tourniquets, IV kits, and splints, and they received first aid training by videoconferencing.

Sanitation was an important issue in their hot, humid environment, and the miners took steps to maintain hygiene throughout their confinement. "They know how to maintain their environment. They have a designated bathroom area, garbage area and are even recycling," said Dr Andrés Llarena, an anesthesiologist with the Chilean navy. "They put plastic stuff away from biological [wastes], in different holes. They are taking care of their place." The men used a natural waterfall for regular showers and received soap and shampoo from the palomas, while dirty laundry was sent out. They dug out several fresh water sources which doctors determined to be potable and were provided water purification tablets as well.

Environmental and safety issues were also a primary concern. Jimmy Sánchez, the youngest of the group at 19, was assigned as the "environmental assistant", and tested the air quality daily with a hand-held computerized device that measured oxygen, carbon dioxide levels and air temperature that normally averaged 31 °C (88 °F). Teams of miners also patrolled their area to identify and prevent potential rockfalls and pry loose hazardous stones from the ceiling, while others worked to divert the streams of water from the drilling operations.

Health Minister Jaime Mañalich stated, "The situation is very similar to the one experienced by astronauts who spend months on end in the space station." On 31 August, a team from NASA in the United States arrived in Chile to provide assistance. The team included two physicians, one psychologist, and an engineer.

After the rescue, Dr. Rodrigo Figueroa, chief of the Trauma Stress and Disaster unit of the Pontifical Catholic University of Chile, said there were serious shortcomings in the censorship of letters to and from their relatives above ground and in the monitoring of activities the miners could undertake, as being underground has suddenly turned them into “babies,” he said. But the natural strength of “The 33” managed to keep them alive, and their natural organization into teams as a response to disaster was also part of the human response to threat. And as the miners’ sound minds have seen them through, they will continue to be tested as they now resume life above ground.

== See also ==
- Quecreek Mine Rescue involved a similar rescue capsule in Pennsylvania, July 2002 to rescue a trapped mining crew.
- Dahlbusch Bomb
