= Lahstedt =

- Municipality
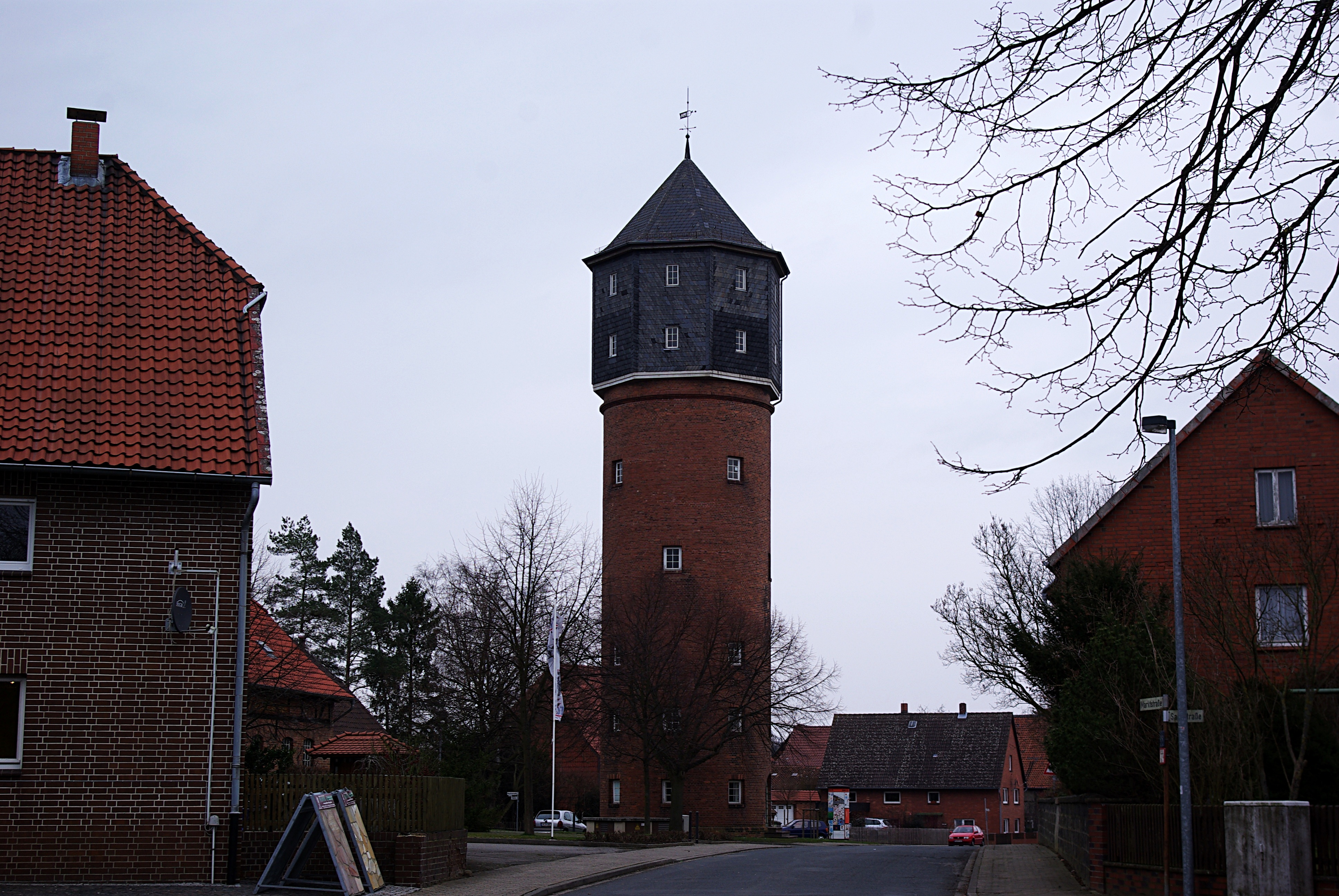
- Water tower

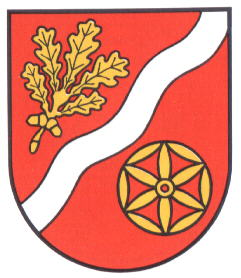
- Coat of arms
- Interactive map of Lahstedt
- Location within Germany Location within Lower Saxony
- Coordinates: 52°15′N 10°13′E
- Country: Germany
- State: Lower Saxony
- District: Peine
- Disbanded: 2015
- Subdivisions: 5 Ortsteile

Area
  - Total: 43.6 km^{2} (16.8 sq mi)
- Elevation: 97 m (318 ft)

Population (2013-12-31)
  - Total: 9,985
  - Density: 229/km^{2} (593/sq mi)
- Time zone: UTC+01:00 (CET)
  - Summer (DST): UTC+02:00 (CEST)
- Postal codes: 31246
- Dialling codes: 05172, 05174
- Vehicle registration: PE
- Website: www.lahstedt.de

Lahstedt (German pronunciation: [ˈlaːʃtɛt]) is a former municipality in the district of Peine, in Lower Saxony, Germany. It was situated approximately 11 km south of Peine, and 20 km west of Braunschweig.

Lahstedt was formed on 1 February 1971 by merging the five villages of Adenstedt, Gadenstedt, Groß Lafferde, Münstedt and Oberg. "Lahstedt" itself was an artificial name, but not a population centre. Since 1 January 2015 its subdivisions are part of the municipality Ilsede.

== Municipal subdivisions ==
- Adenstedt
- Gadenstedt
- Groß Lafferde
- Münstedt
- Oberg
