= Ilseder Hütte =

Coordinates: 52.260731°N 10.213906°E

Aktiengesellschaft Ilseder Hütte
- Company type: Joint-stock company (Aktiengesellschaft)
- Industry: Steel industry
- Predecessor: Bergbau und Hüttengesellschaft zu Peine
- Founded: 1858
- Founder: Fritz Hurtzig, Carl Haarmann
- Defunct: 1970
- Fate: merged
- Successor: Salzgitter AG
- Headquarters: Ilsede, Germany
- Products: steel

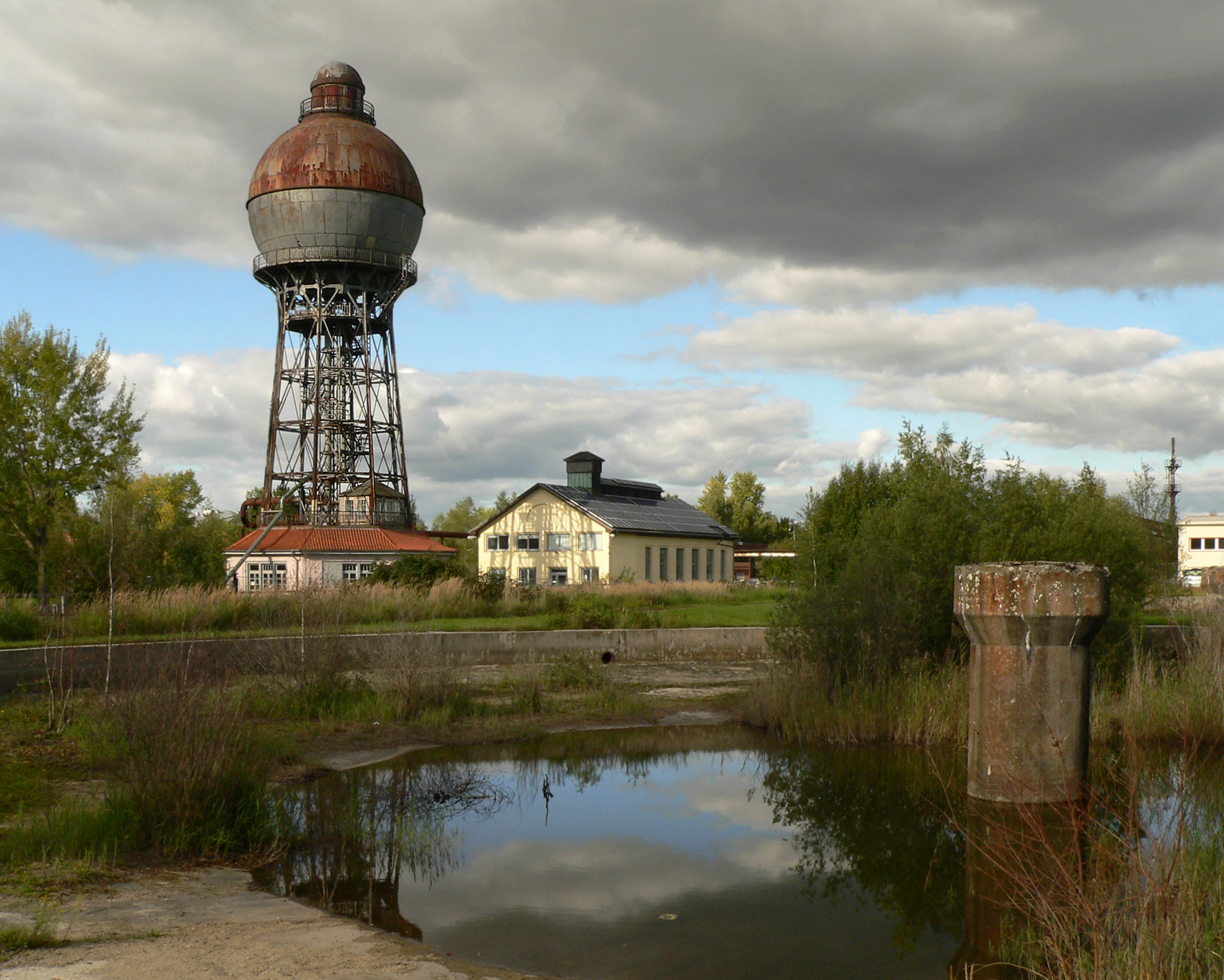
Water tower and electrical substation of Ilseder Hütte

The Ilseder Hütte is a former ironworks in Ilsede (district of Peine) in Lower Saxony, Germany

== History ==
Funded by the bank Ephraim Meyer & Sohn Carl Hostmann founded an Ironworks based on supposed both coal- and orefields in this area. Though there were then found no sufficient coal fields, the company, named "Bergbau und Hüttengesellschaft zu Peine" was established in 1853. This company ended in insolvency during an economical crisis in 1858.

Under Fritz Hurtzig and Carl Haarmann on September 6, 1858 the "Aktiengesellschaft Ilseder Hütte" was taking over the assets, and in 1861 the production started. Despite the site's unfavorable geographical situation, the factory prospered and rapidly expanded its business.

In the era of the German Empire, the company became a major player in Germany's coal and steel industry. In 1872 a rolling mill was added and in 1879 a third blast furnace started work.

In 1928 the Ilseder Hütte took a 10 billion US-$ loan from the National City Bank of New York.

In 1929 the opening of the Mittelland Canal reduced the transport's costs.

World War II caused no damage and the company expanded up to 1970s economic crisis.

== Mergers ==
In 1970 the company merged with the state-owned Salzgitter AG. The ore mining ended in 1978 and in 1983 the last blast furnace was shut down.

In 1989 the company became part of Preussag (Note: The Preussag, at this time was an industrial holding company that changed later on its business field to tourism) Preussag stopped in 1995 the remaining productive parts such as coking plant, power plant and by-products.

The area became an industrial park. The blowing engine building is in use for various events whereas the steam production building was torn down in spring 2010.

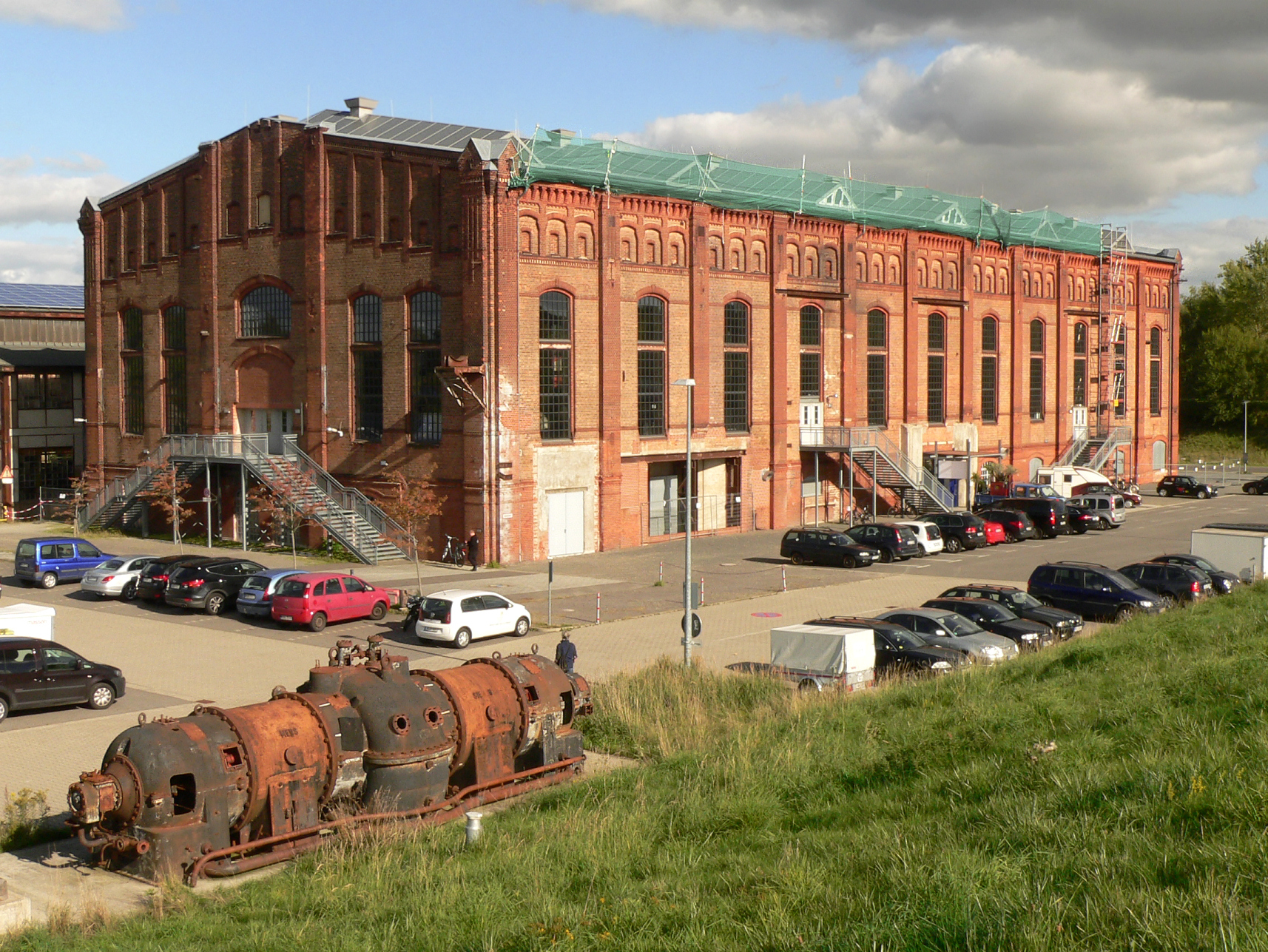
Former blowing engine building of Ilseder Hütte, in front a Ljungström turbine

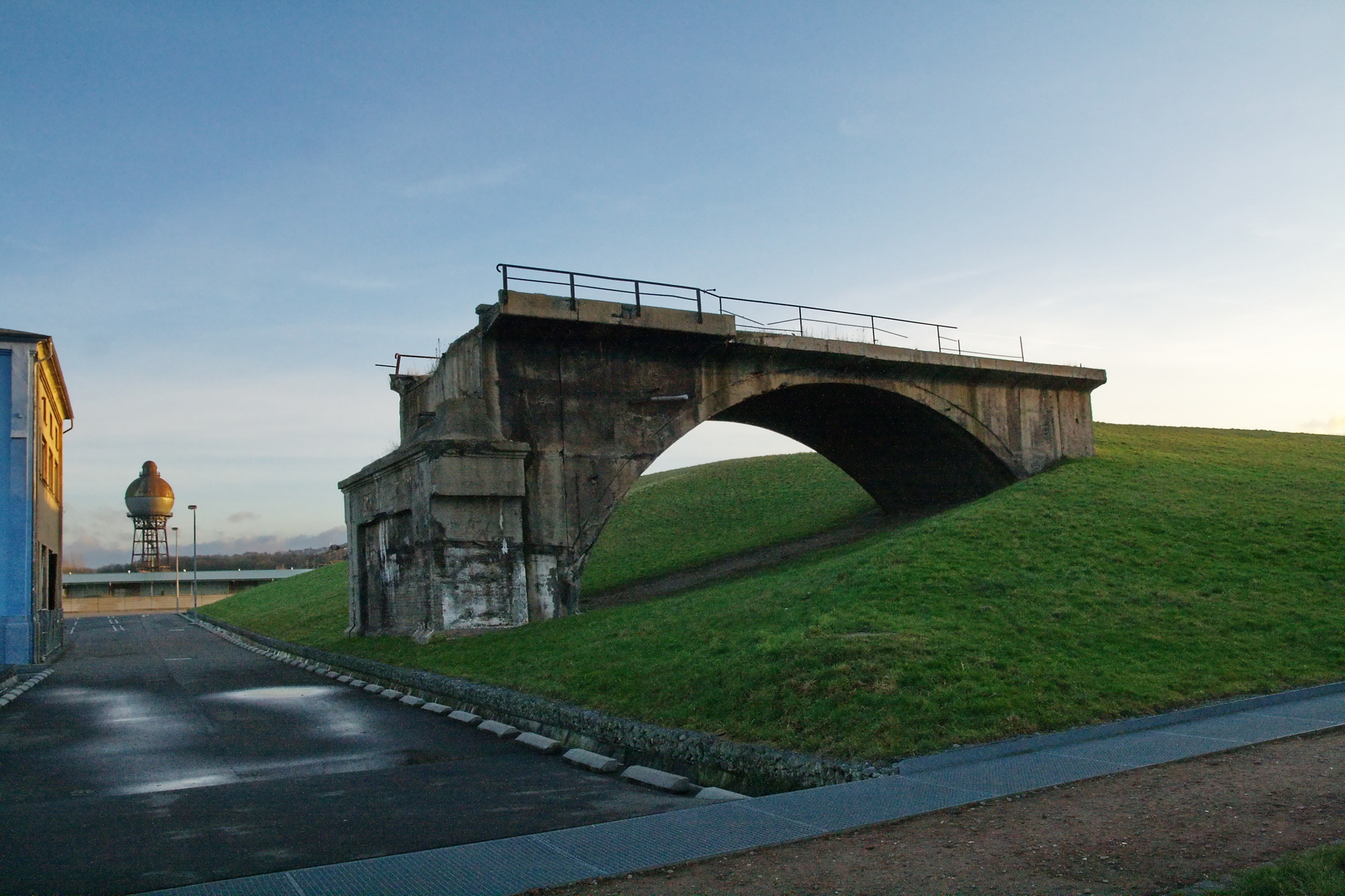
Remains of a bridge in industrial park Ilseder Hütte, 2008

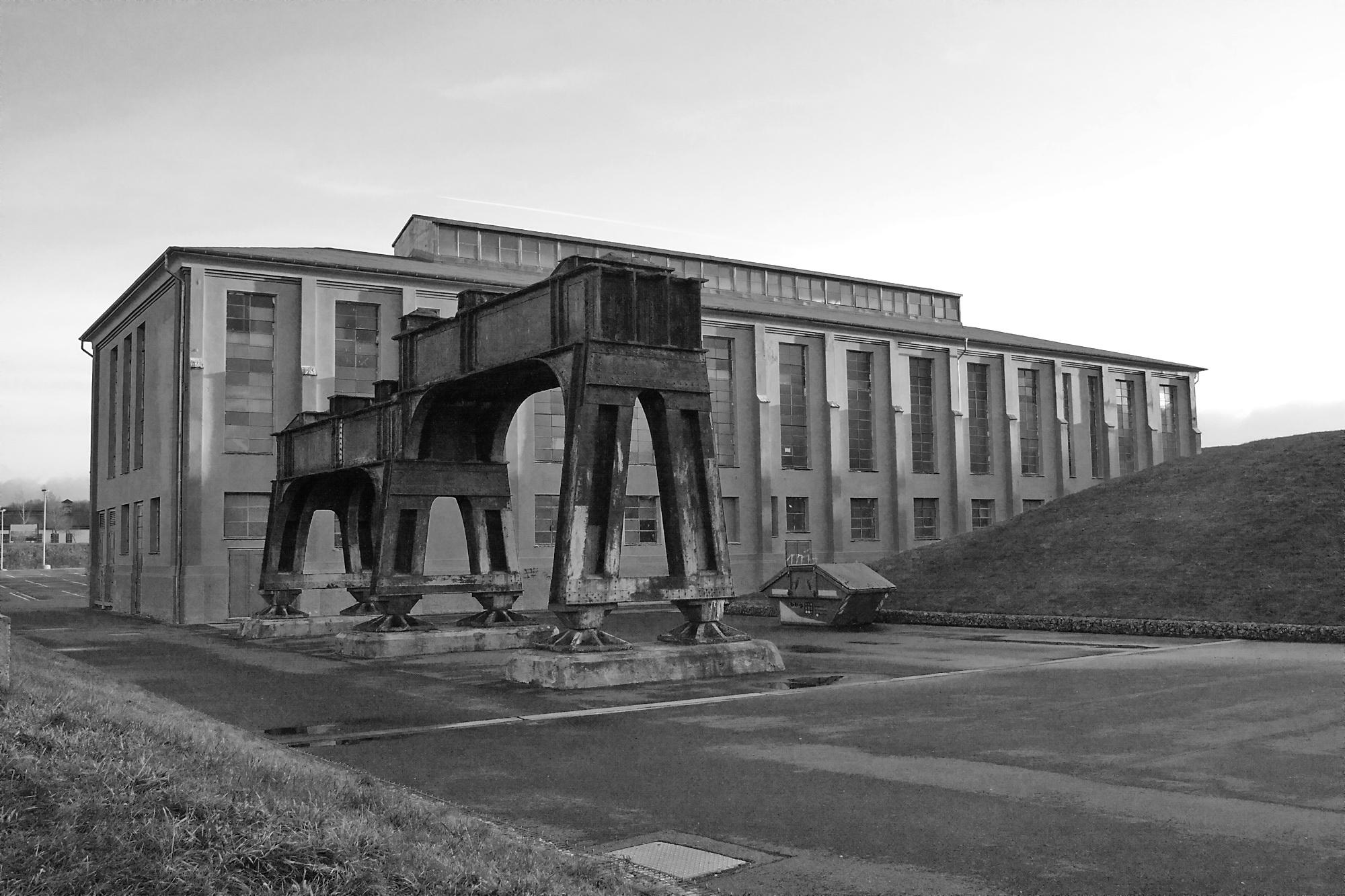
Former steam production building Ilseder Hütte, 2008

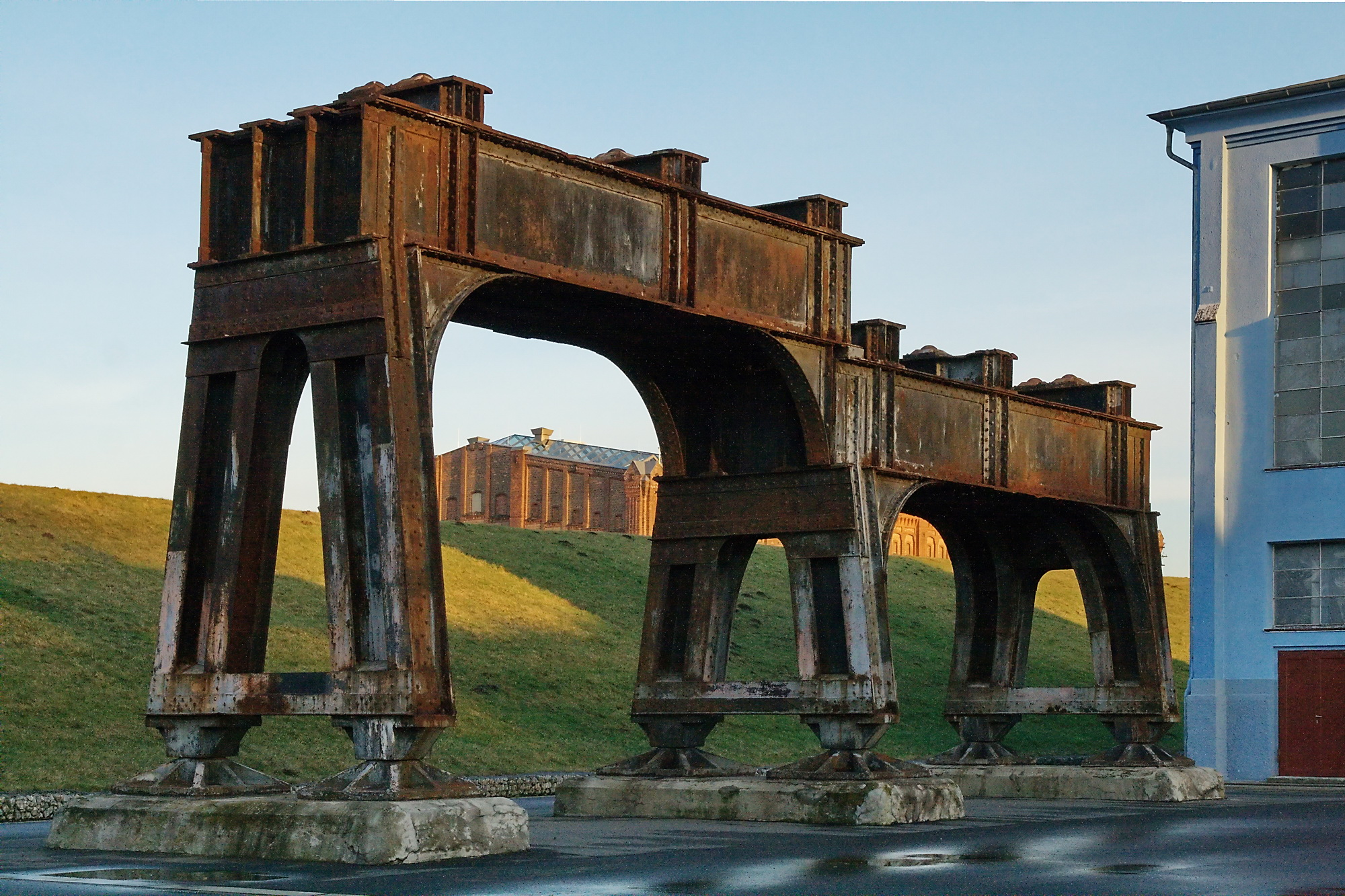
Site near the steam production building of Ilseder Hütte, 2008

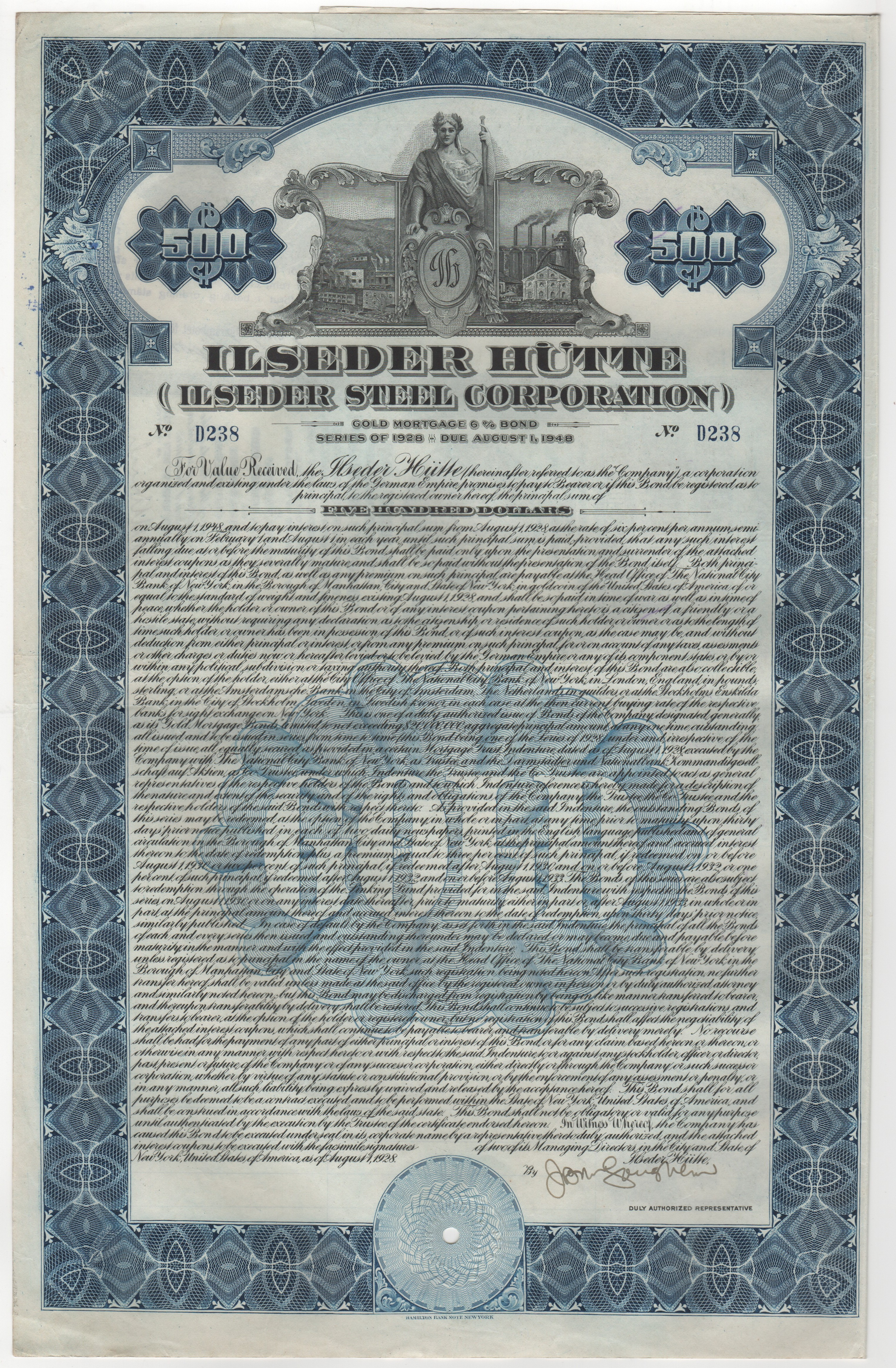
Gold bond of the Ilseder Hütte, issued 1 August 1928

== See also ==
- Zollverein Coal Mine Industrial Complex
- Dillinger Hütte

== Literature ==
- Wilhelm Treue (1960). Die Geschichte der Ilseder Hütte (in German). Peine, München: Ilseder Hütte.
- Rudolf Apel, Kurt Schoenfeld, Manfred Vorberg (2004). Die Ilseder Hütte 100 Jahre Industriegeschichte (in German). Erfurt: Förderverein Haus der Geschichte Ilseder Hütte. ISBN 3-89702-736-4.
