= Vechelde =

- Municipality
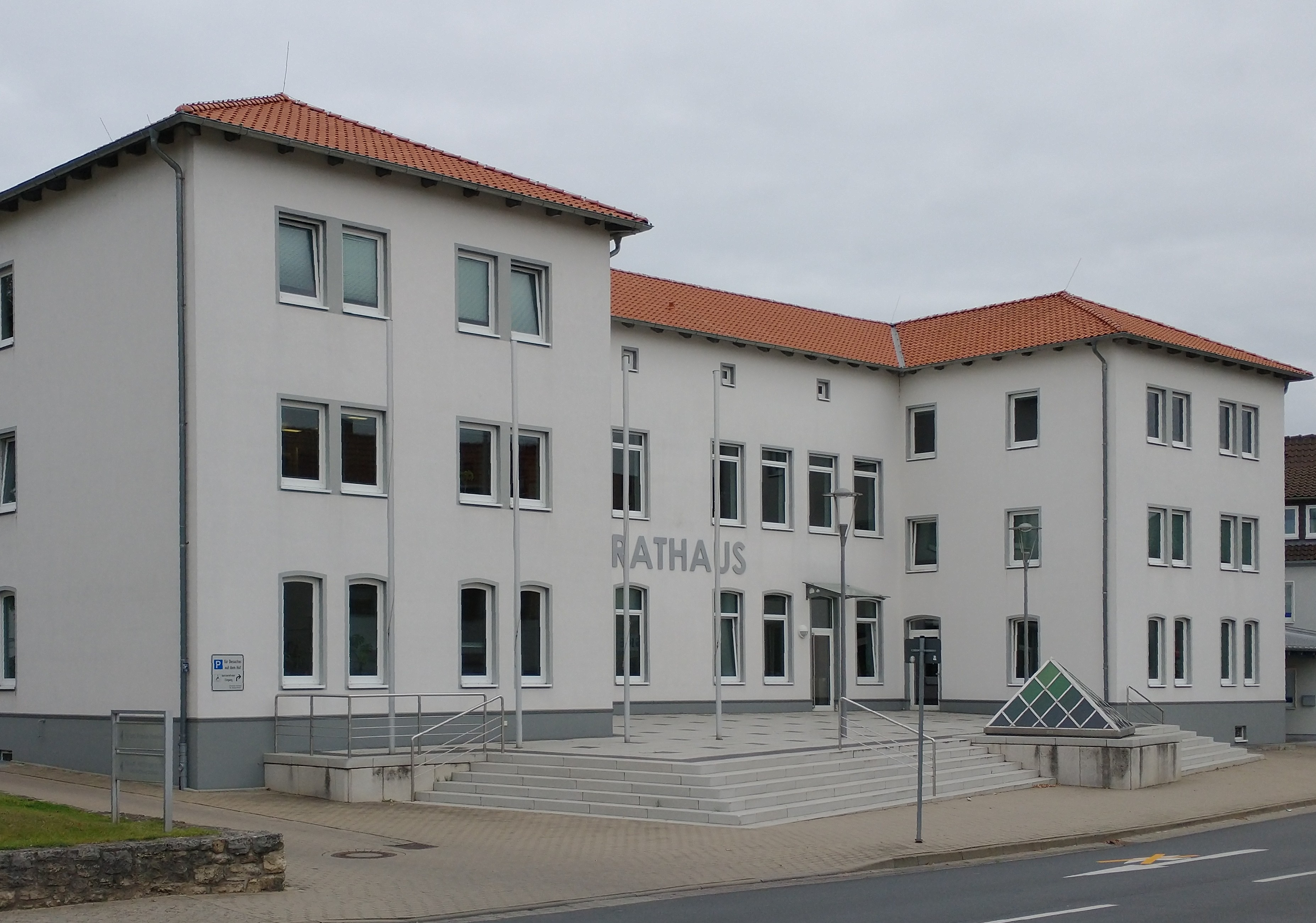
- Town hall Vechelde

- Coat of arms

- Location of Vechelde within Peine district
- Interactive map of Vechelde
- Location within Germany Location within Lower Saxony
- Coordinates: 52°15.65′N 10°22.32′E
- Country: Germany
- State: Lower Saxony
- District: Peine
- Subdivisions: 17 districts

Government
  - Mayor (2021–26): Tobias Grünert (CDU)

Area
  - Total: 76.24 km^{2} (29.44 sq mi)
- Elevation: 74 m (243 ft)

Population (2025-12-31)
  - Total: 18,060
  - Density: 236.9/km^{2} (613.5/sq mi)
- Time zone: UTC+01:00 (CET)
  - Summer (DST): UTC+02:00 (CEST)
- Postal codes: 38159
- Dialling codes: 05302, 05300
- Vehicle registration: PE
- Website: www.vechelde.de

Vechelde (German pronunciation: [ˈfɛçl̩də]) is a municipality in the district of Peine, in Lower Saxony, Germany. It is situated approximately 12 km southeast of Peine, and 10 km west of Braunschweig.

== Municipal subdivisions ==
- Alvesse
- Bettmar
- Bodenstedt
- Denstorf
- Fürstenau
- Groß Gleidingen
- Klein Gleidingen
- Köchingen
- Liedingen
- Sierße
- Sonnenberg
- Vallstedt
- Vechelade
- Vechelde
- Wahle
- Wedtlenstedt
- Wierthe

== Twinned cities ==
Vechelde is twinned with:

- Valkeakoski, Finland since 1976
- Biederitz in Saxony-Anhalt, Germany since 1990
- Niemodlin, Poland since 2006

== Main sights ==
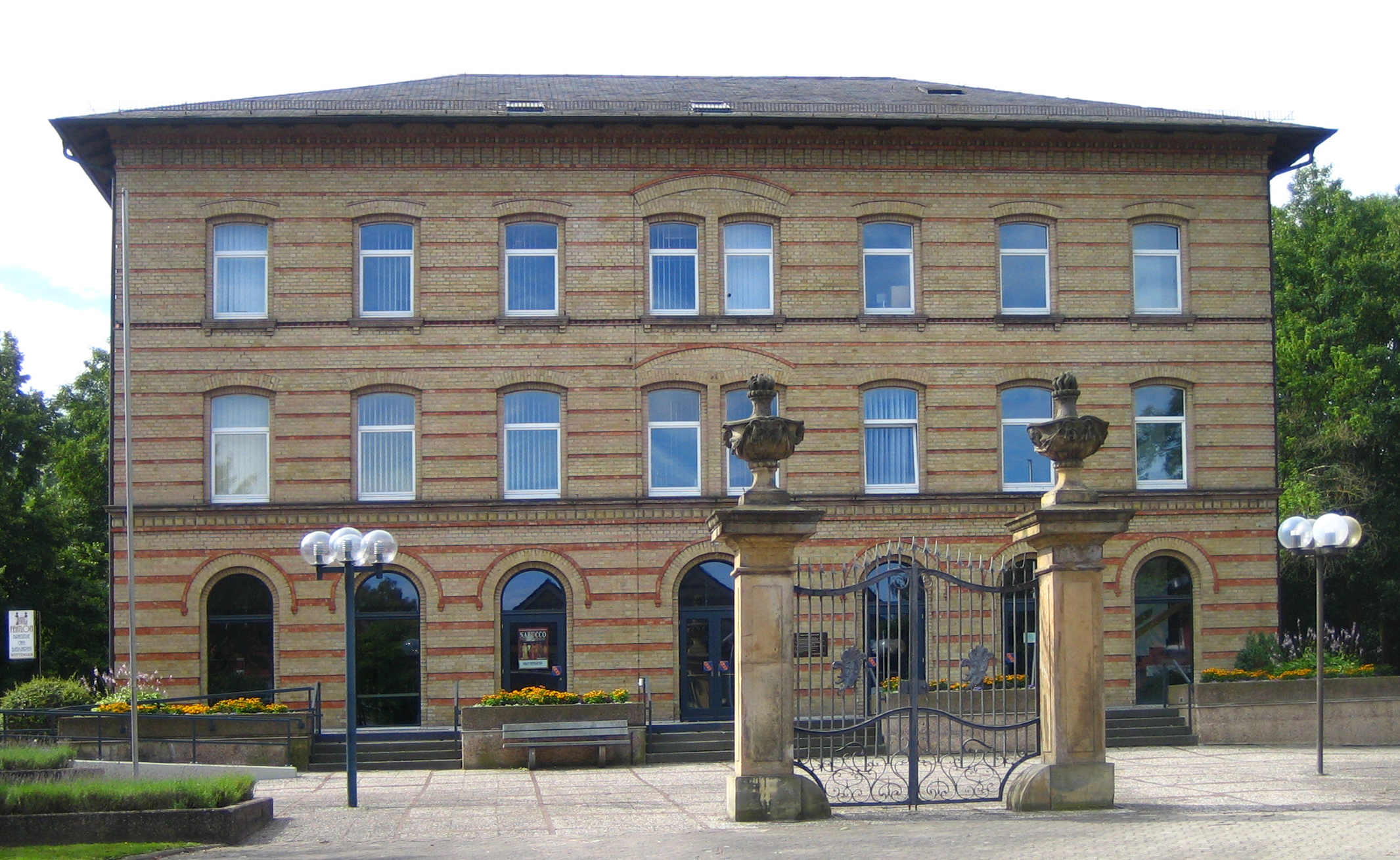
The cultural center, former local district court, and “Duke Ferdinand’s gate“

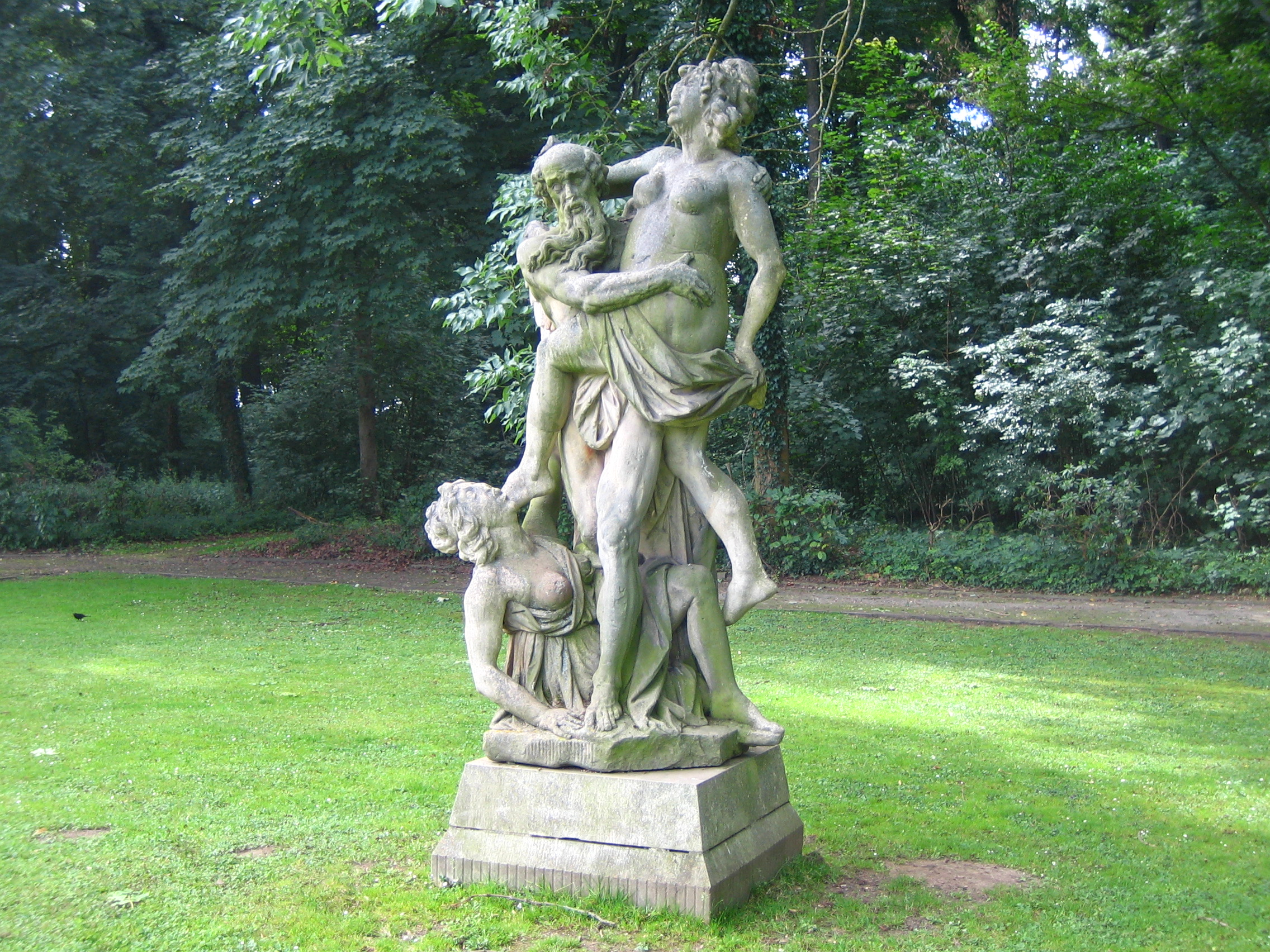
Statue “The Rape of Persephone” in Vechelde palace garden

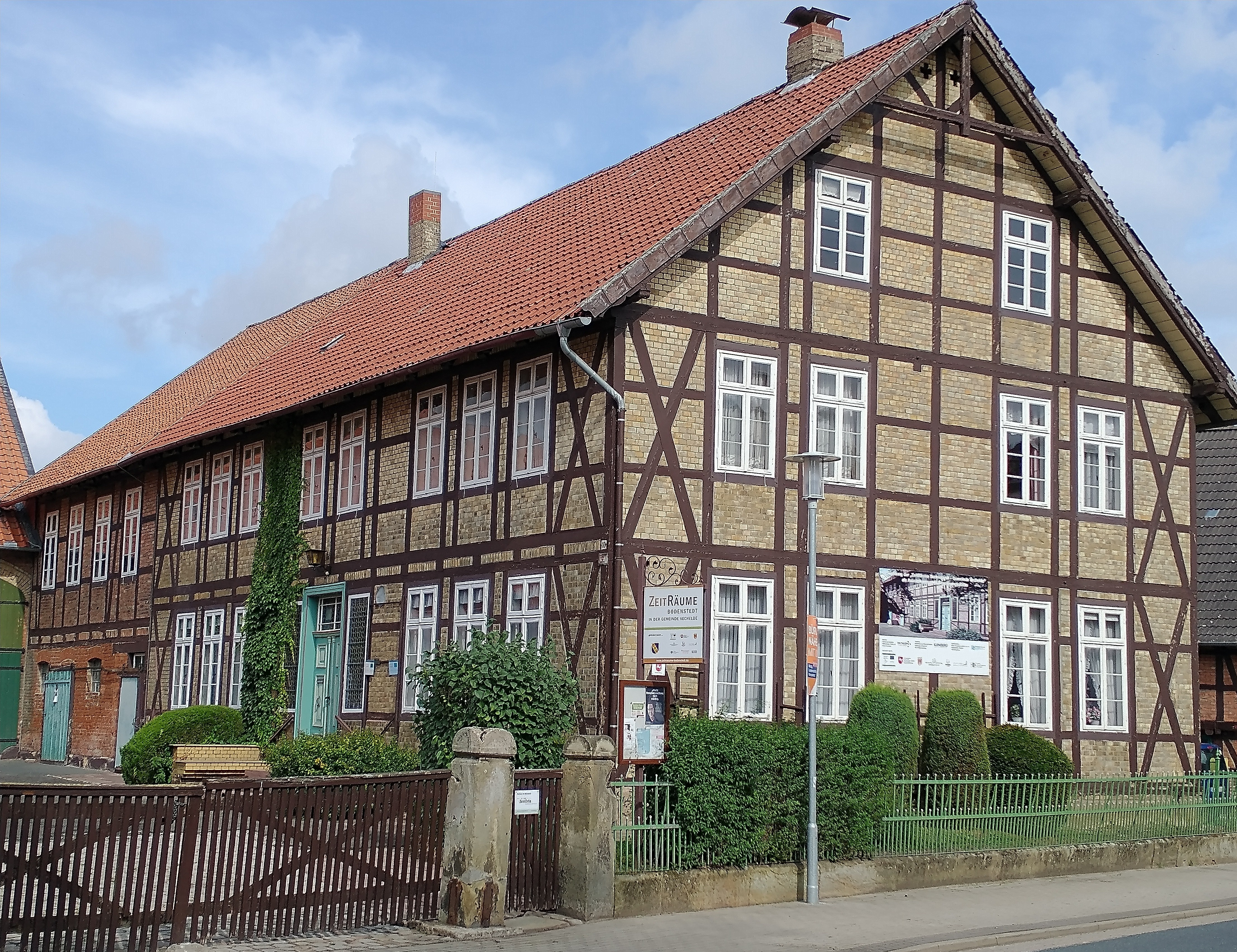
“Zeiträume museum“, accessible rooms are presented in their original state, with historical backgrounds from the past 140 years

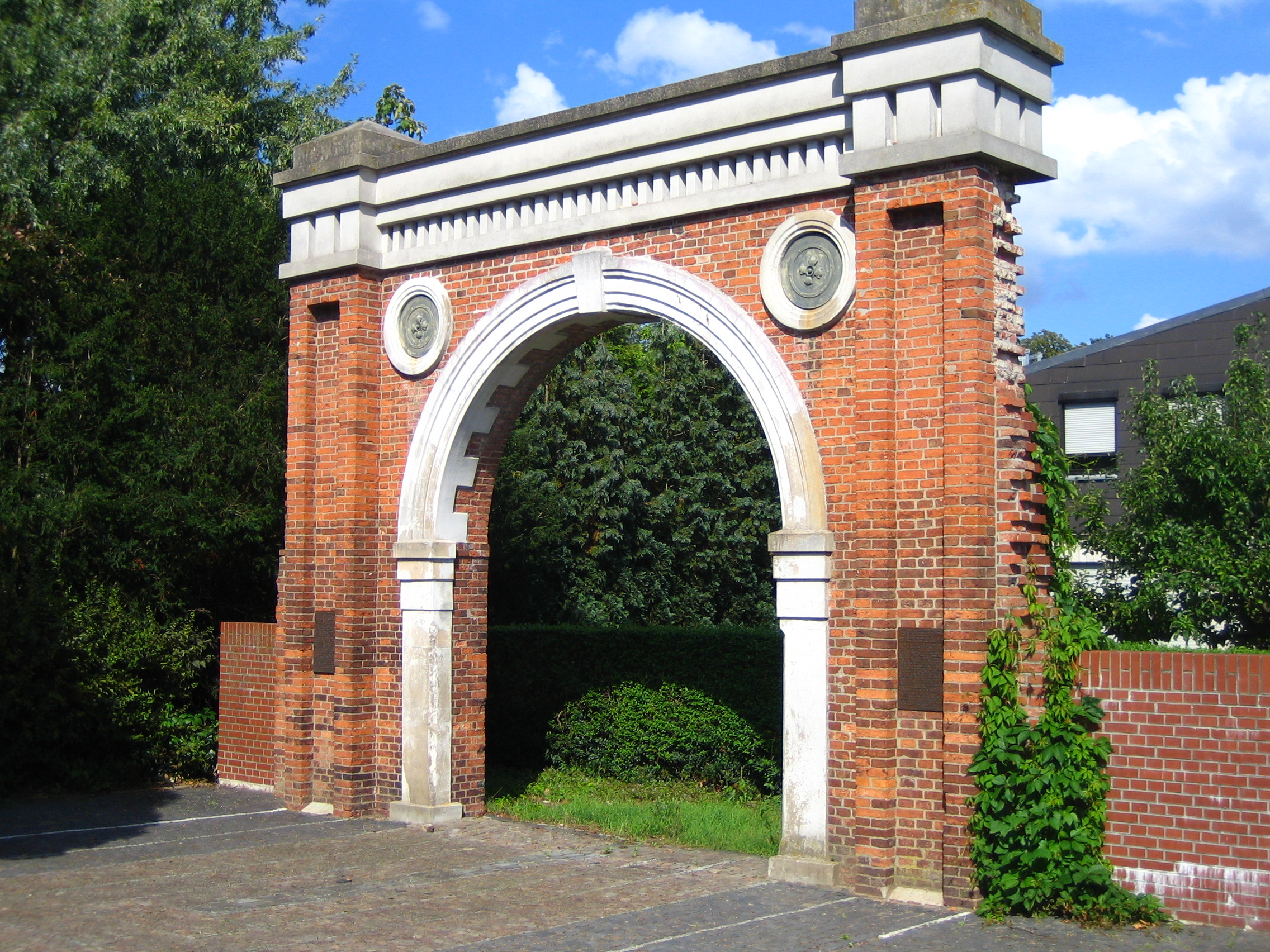
The “jute gate“, entrance gate of the former jute spinning mill. Today memorial for the victims of the Vechelde concentration camp.
