= Lengede =

- Municipality
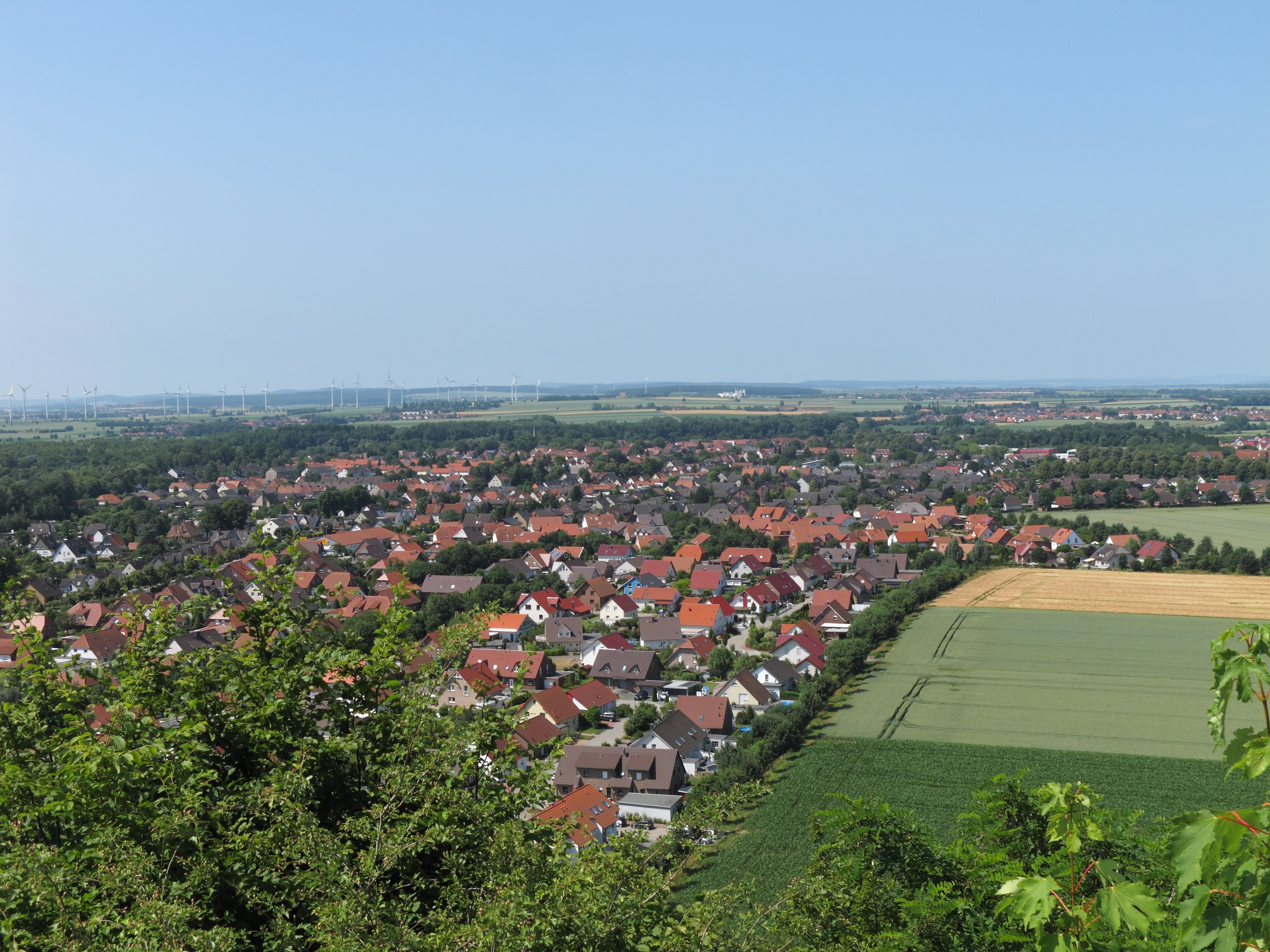

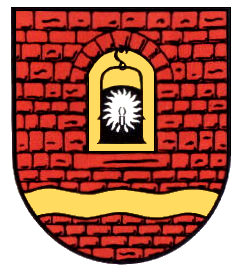
- Coat of arms

- Location of Lengede within Peine district
- Interactive map of Lengede
- Location within Germany Location within Lower Saxony
- Coordinates: 52°12′N 10°18′E
- Country: Germany
- State: Lower Saxony
- District: Peine
- Subdivisions: 5 districts

Government
  - Mayor (2021–26): Maren Wegener (SPD)

Area
  - Total: 34.34 km^{2} (13.26 sq mi)
- Elevation: 157 m (515 ft)

Population (2025-12-31)
  - Total: 14,675
  - Density: 427.3/km^{2} (1,107/sq mi)
- Time zone: UTC+01:00 (CET)
  - Summer (DST): UTC+02:00 (CEST)
- Postal codes: 38268
- Dialling codes: 05174, 05344
- Vehicle registration: PE
- Website: www.lengede.de

Lengede (German pronunciation: [ˈlɛŋədə]) is a municipality in the district of Peine, in Lower Saxony, Germany, some 18 kilometers southwest of Braunschweig and 40 kilometers southeast of Hanover. It became known to the world in 1963 because of a mining disaster and the subsequent rescue operation of eleven surviving miners, which became known as the "Wunder von Lengede" ("Miracle of Lengede").

== Geography ==
=== Division of the municipality ===
Lengede consists of the following districts

- Barbecke
- Broistedt
- Klein Lafferde
- Lengede
- Woltwiesche

== History ==
=== The Miracle of Lengede ===
A lot of water was needed to wash the ore of the iron mine Mathilde in Lengede, and several artificial lakes existed right above the underground mine. At 8 p.m. on 24 October 1963, water and mud from one of those lakes broke into the mine. At that time, 129 men were working underground. Seventy-nine men managed to escape right away. A group of seven men was reached with a drill; when the water level receded on the next day, they could be saved with a float.

Four men went to the elevated end of a gallery; even though it was below water level, the air pocket there prevented the water from entering. Expecting to find men there, a drilling was begun to the cavern some 79 meters below ground. In the meantime, journalists from all over the world had assembled. As it was of utmost importance to protect the air pocket, pressured air was pumped down. After six days, three men were finally rescued; a fourth had died in the meantime. The men were brought up with the Dahlbusch-Bombe, a tiny metal pipe which allows one man to stand inside. They had to spend several hours in a pressure chamber before being released.

A group of twenty-one men had fled to an old part of the mine, known as the Old Man, which was not used anymore and had already partly collapsed. Falling rocks killed several men there, ventilation was poor, and after a while their lamps went dark. The management of the mine was already about to end the rescue operation and call for funeral services, when some miners pointed out that some men would have tried to escape to the Old Man and were maybe still there. No exact plans for that part of the mine were available, and an exploratory drill was started.

Fifty-six metres underground, a cavern was reached. Tapping signs were heard, and the rescuers let food, water and even a microphone down to the men below. Ludwig Erhard, who had been elected Bundeskanzler just weeks earlier, came to Lengede and spoke to the trapped men, then the real drilling began. Because of concerns about the poor condition of Old Man, water was considered too heavy for use in the drilling below 40 metres and pressured air was used instead. At 6 a.m. on November 7, the men were reached. Two miners went down with the Dahlbusch-Bombe to help their colleagues come up. Eleven men were rescued.

All in all, twenty-nine men died in the disaster. When the mine was later cleared, it was found that some of them had lived for about 14 days underground. One man was never found.

Legal proceeding continued for some five years to determine whether anyone was responsible for the disaster, but in the end no one was prosecuted.

== See also ==
- Metropolitan region Hannover-Braunschweig-Göttingen-Wolfsburg
