= Ilsede =

- Municipality
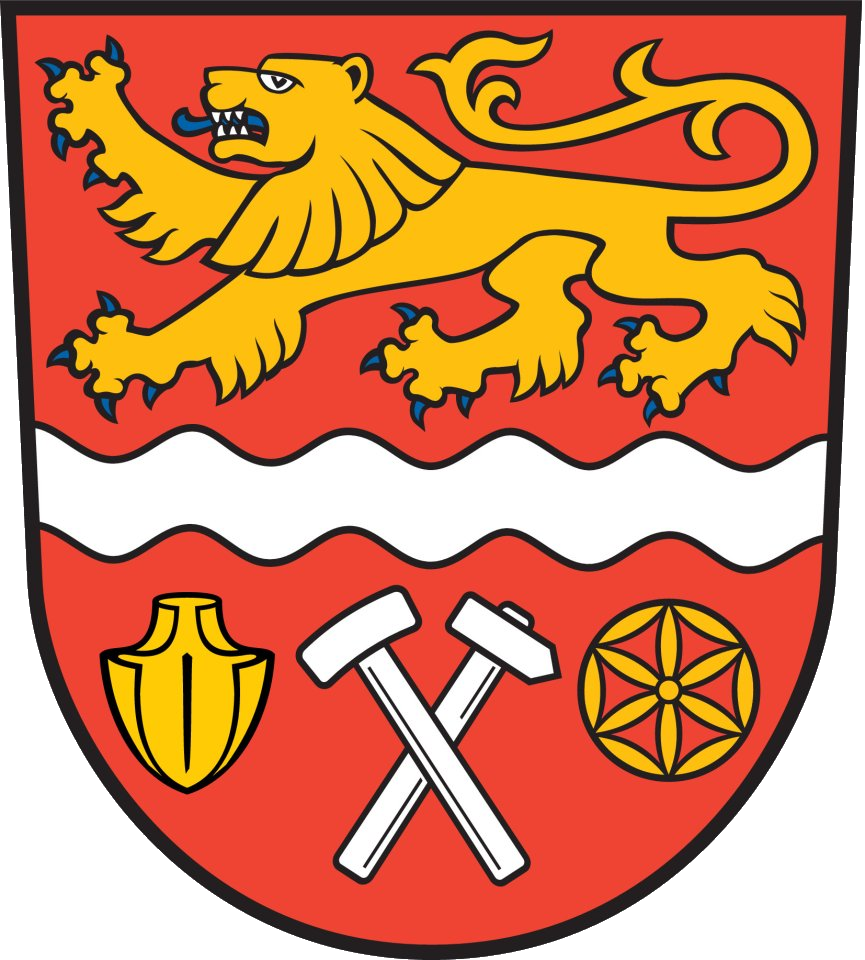
- Coat of arms

- Location of Ilsede within Peine district
- Interactive map of Ilsede
- Location within Germany Location within Lower Saxony
- Coordinates: 52°16′N 10°11′E
- Country: Germany
- State: Lower Saxony
- District: Peine

Government
  - Mayor (2021–26): Nils Neuhäuser genannt Holtbrügge (Ind.)

Area
  - Total: 72.22 km^{2} (27.88 sq mi)
- Elevation: 75 m (246 ft)

Population (2025-12-31)
  - Total: 21,525
  - Density: 298.0/km^{2} (771.9/sq mi)
- Time zone: UTC+01:00 (CET)
  - Summer (DST): UTC+02:00 (CEST)
- Postal codes: 31241, 31246
- Dialling codes: 05172, 05174
- Vehicle registration: PE
- Website: www.gemeinde-ilsede.de

Ilsede (German pronunciation: [ˈɪlzədə]) is a municipality in the district of Peine, in Lower Saxony, Germany. It is situated on the river Fuhse, approx. 7 km south of Peine, and 20 km west of Braunschweig.

Ilsede in its present borders was formed in 2015 by merging the municipalities Lahstedt and the former municipality Ilsede.

== History ==
In the area of the municipality Ilsede one finds the most accessible burial mounds in the southwest area of the Bülten wood. They are just a few steps away from the path that leads from Groß Bülten to Rosenthal. A small forest path leads directly to the old grave field. Although mighty trees have grown on the burial mounds in the meantime, the graves are still clearly visible.

At the edge of the forest, an erratic boulder with the inscription "Grave field of the Bronze Age, approx. 1000 BC. BC ”to the historic cemetery. The site is one of the protected archaeological cultural monuments in the district of Peine in the Heers (this is the neighboring, northwest forest section) and in Gräwig (northeast of the village of Klein Ilsede).

During the witch persecution, from 1564 to 1621, 22 people from the Ilsede municipality got into witch trials, 17 of them from Gadenstedt (nine were burned, four died under torture). Three people from Groß Ilsede were burned and a woman from Lafferde died under torture. The fate of a girl from Lahstedt is unknown.

The start of operations at the Ilseder hut in 1858 established a new, industrial section of its history for the Ilseder region. Until then, the communities in this area were purely rural. From now on, iron ore mining and blast furnace operations shaped the world of work and the economy. Nevertheless, agriculture remained an important economic factor. The mining of raw materials and the Ilseder hut were the founding companies of today's global group Salzgitter AG and TUI AG

The municipality of Ilsede has existed as a local authority since February 1, 1971. Even before the regional reform in Lower Saxony, the municipalities of Bülten, Groß Bülten, Groß Ilsede, Klein Ilsede, Ölsburg and Solschen merged through their own initiative to form the newly created unitary community of Ilsede. The communities that had been independent up to this point were largely regarded as belonging together, due to the many similarities regarding iron ore mining and the Ilseder hut, even before the merger.

In 2006 Ilsede hosted the cultural festival Day of the Brunswick Landscape.

On July 10, 2014, the members of both municipal councils decided on the merger of the municipalities Ilsede and Lahstedt, which had already been considered in 1971 but was not realized at the time. Ilsede was also chosen as the name of the new municipality. Since January 1, 2015, the new community Ilsede includes the areas and districts of the former communities Ilsede and Lahstedt. Adenstedt, Gadenstedt, Groß Lafferde, Münstedt and Oberg have been part of the municipality of Ilsede since then. As a result of the merger, the municipal area increased from 28.45 km^{2} (as of 2014) to 72.09 km^{2} and the population of 11,366 (as of September 30, 2014). at 21,308 (as of January 1, 2015)

== Municipal subdivisions ==
- Adenstedt
- Bülten
- Gadenstedt
- Groß Bülten
- Groß Ilsede
- Groß Lafferde
- Klein Ilsede
- Münstedt
- Oberg
- Ölsburg
- Solschen

== Personalities ==
Erkanbald (before 982–1021), Abbot of Fulda and Archbishop of Mainz, probably born in Ölsburg

Joachim Vinzelberg, pastor in Münstedt (1654) and hymn writer

Ernst Christoph Böttcher (1697–1766), merchant and founder of the royal school teacher seminar and patron, was born in Groß Lafferde

Johann Peter Hundeniker (1751–1836), educator and ducal Brunswick school board, born in Groß Lafferde

Julius Hundeniker (1784–1854), Lutheran clergyman and novelist, born in Groß Lafferde

Wilhelm Theodor Hundeniker (1786–1828), educator and philologist, born in Groß Lafferde

Fritz Behrens (1836–1920), industrialist and philanthropist, born in Groß Lafferde

Friedrich Cramm (1874–1942), farmer, politician (DVP) and Member of the Reichstag, born in Groß Lafferde

Wilhelm Kleemann (1885–1956), educator, politician (SPD) and senator in Bremen, born in Groß Lafferde

Paul Steegemann (1894–1956), publisher, born in Groß Lafferde

Bruno Brandes (1910–1985), politician (CDU)

Wilhelm Baumgarten (1913–1996), politician (SPD), born in Groß Lafferde

Will Brandes (1928–1990), pop singer, born in Münstedt

Gerhard Ahrens (* 1932), football player, born in Oberg

Dieter Warzecha (1934–2005), artist, lived and worked in Groß Ilsede

Klaus G. Troitzsch (* 1946), sociologist, born in Oberg

Hartmut Möllring (* 1951), politician (CDU), born in Groß Ilsede

Annette Sabban (1953–2019), language and translation scientist, born in Klein Bülten

Uwe Schrader (* 1954), director and professor of artistic film at the University of Hildesheim, was born in Groß Bülten

Erwin Skamrahl (* 1958), athlete and Olympic athlete, born in Oberg

Personalities related to the city

Friedrich Brandis (1775–1854), Lutheran theologian, consistorial councilor and general superintendent

Luise Rosendorf (1821–1890), cookbook author E

wald Hecker (entrepreneur) (1879–1954), chairman of the Ilseder Hütte supervisory board and SS brigade leader

Wolfgang Marzahn (1911–1988), Lutheran theologian and author

Rosemarie Tinius (* 1945), businesswoman, teacher in Ilsede (1970–1994), politician (SPD)

Caren Miosga (* 1969), TV presenter for ARD Tagesthemen since 2007, grew up in Groß Ilsede

Herma Auguste Wittstock (* 1977), performance artist, grew up in Ölsburg
