= Edemissen =

- Municipality
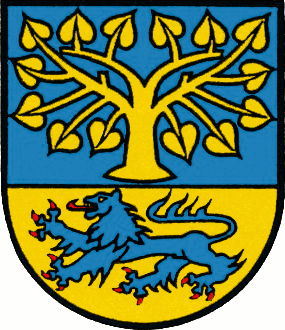
- Coat of arms

- Location of Edemissen within Peine district
- Interactive map of Edemissen
- Location within Germany Location within Lower Saxony
- Coordinates: 52°23′N 10°16′E
- Country: Germany
- State: Lower Saxony
- District: Peine
- Subdivisions: 14 districts

Government
  - Mayor (2021–26): Tobias Faust (SPD)

Area
  - Total: 104.12 km^{2} (40.20 sq mi)
- Elevation: 70 m (230 ft)

Population (2025-12-31)
  - Total: 12,322
  - Density: 118.34/km^{2} (306.51/sq mi)
- Time zone: UTC+01:00 (CET)
  - Summer (DST): UTC+02:00 (CEST)
- Postal codes: 31234
- Dialling codes: 05176, 05177, 05372, 05373
- Vehicle registration: PE
- Website: www.edemissen.de

Edemissen (German pronunciation: [ˈeːdəmɪsn̩]; Low German: Emisse) is a municipality in the district of Peine, in Lower Saxony, Germany. It is situated approximately 7 km north of Peine, and 25 km northwest of Braunschweig.

== Municipal subdivisions ==
- Abbensen
- Alvesse
- Blumenhagen and
  Klein Blumenhagen
- Eddesse and Klein Eddesse
- Edemissen and Ankensen,
  Berkhöpen and Oelheim
- Eickenrode
- Mödesse
- Oedesse and Klein Oedesse
- Oelerse
- Plockhorst
- Rietze and Klein Rietze
- Voigtholz-Ahlemissen
- Wehnsen
- Wipshausen

== Personalities ==
- Adolf-Friedrich Kuntzen (1889–1964), officer, most recently General of the Panzertruppe in the Second World War
- Hans Nowak (1922–1996), artist painter
- Ernst Schacht (1953–2008), theologian, Evangelical Lutheran bishop
