= Wunder von Lengede =

Rescue of 11 West German miners following a mine collapse in 1963

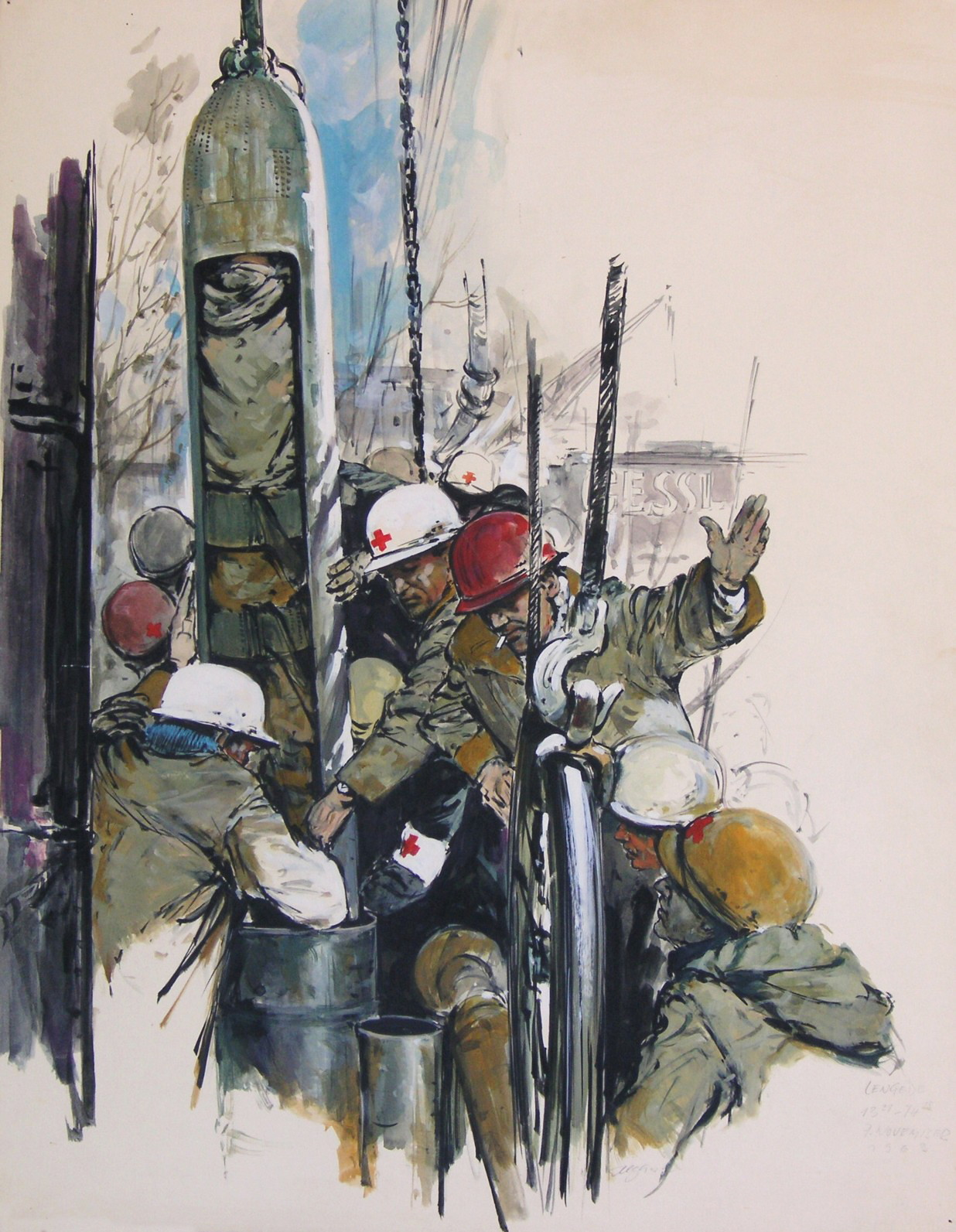
Wunder von Lengede, illustration (1963) by Helmuth Ellgaard

On 7 November 1963, 11 West German miners were rescued from a collapsed mine after surviving for 14 days, an event that later became known as the Wunder von Lengede ("miracle of Lengede").

On 24 October 1963, the Lengede-Broistedt Iron Mine near Salzgitter was flooded with 500,000 cubic metres (18,000,000 cu ft) of muddy water after a sedimentation pond had broken its ground and the tunnels between the 60-metre (200 ft) and 100 m (330 ft) levels. Out of 129 workers, 79 escaped during the first few hours. They used underground mine ventilation raises and further shafts which had been provided with ladders due to safety regulations. At first there seemed to be no hope for the remaining 50 miners. Several attempts and deliberations about possible rescue positions within the mine and the successful rescue of miners at the one or other locations gave rise to a sequence of dramatic and technically challenging rescue missions with hitherto unseen worldwide media coverage.

== The float rescue ==
After one day, seven more miners could be located with a small access bore hole close to the Hauptbremsberg, a central transport hub in the mine. While broader rescue drilling was underway, due to the falling water level, they sent a message to the surface that they would try to escape on their own. Four foremen from above secretly took the initiative to meet the men halfway with a makeshift float and get them back to the surface.

== The air bubble ==
It had been calculated that four more workers could have survived in an air bubble on their working place. A bore hole drilled to that section revealed life signs. These miners (only three had actually survived) had to be brought to the surface through an escape hole while significantly high pressure was maintained to avoid decompression sickness and a return of the water. The rescue operations were led by several groups of experts, the medical team led by Dr. Wünsche, an aviation medic. The miners received games, cameras (copies of the photos were returned to them) and a special diet. Various communication channels to friends and loved ones were established. After their rescue on 1 November, rescue equipment was moved off-site, as there seemed to be no hope for the remaining men. A memorial church service for the missing men was already scheduled for 4 November.

== The Alter Mann rescue ==
A worker called Hütter, whose long-time foreman was among the missing, suggested a further escape zone on the previous Sunday to the technical director Ferling. This last escape resort was in an abandoned part of the mine, in German: Alter Mann ("old man"). Under normal conditions, it was absolutely forbidden to enter this area, but workers now and then had a look at Alter Mann areas or used them to take a rest or shortcut. The suggestion led to a final hole being drilled down to this highly dangerous and unstable area. When contact with a new group of 11 survivors was established via hammer signal, newspapers and media worldwide began to speak of a miracle. As the experienced rescuers had hoped, more than 20 miners had fled into the Alter Mann as water rose in the newer parts of the mine. By the time the drill came down, only 11 had survived amid the falling rock, debris, wounded and dying comrades and different water levels. They had only a bottle of tea with them and the batteries of their helmet lamps had to be rationed. Due to instability, the final steps of drilling were done with a compressor.

After a few more days of drilling rescue access holes, the 11 miners were brought to safety on 7 November after being trapped for two weeks. They were rescued from a depth of 59 metres (194 ft) via a 52.2 centimetres (20.6 in) diameter shaft, using a device called Dahlbusch bomb. The remaining 29 workers had died; 19 were killed directly in the disaster, 10 in the aftermath while awaiting rescue.

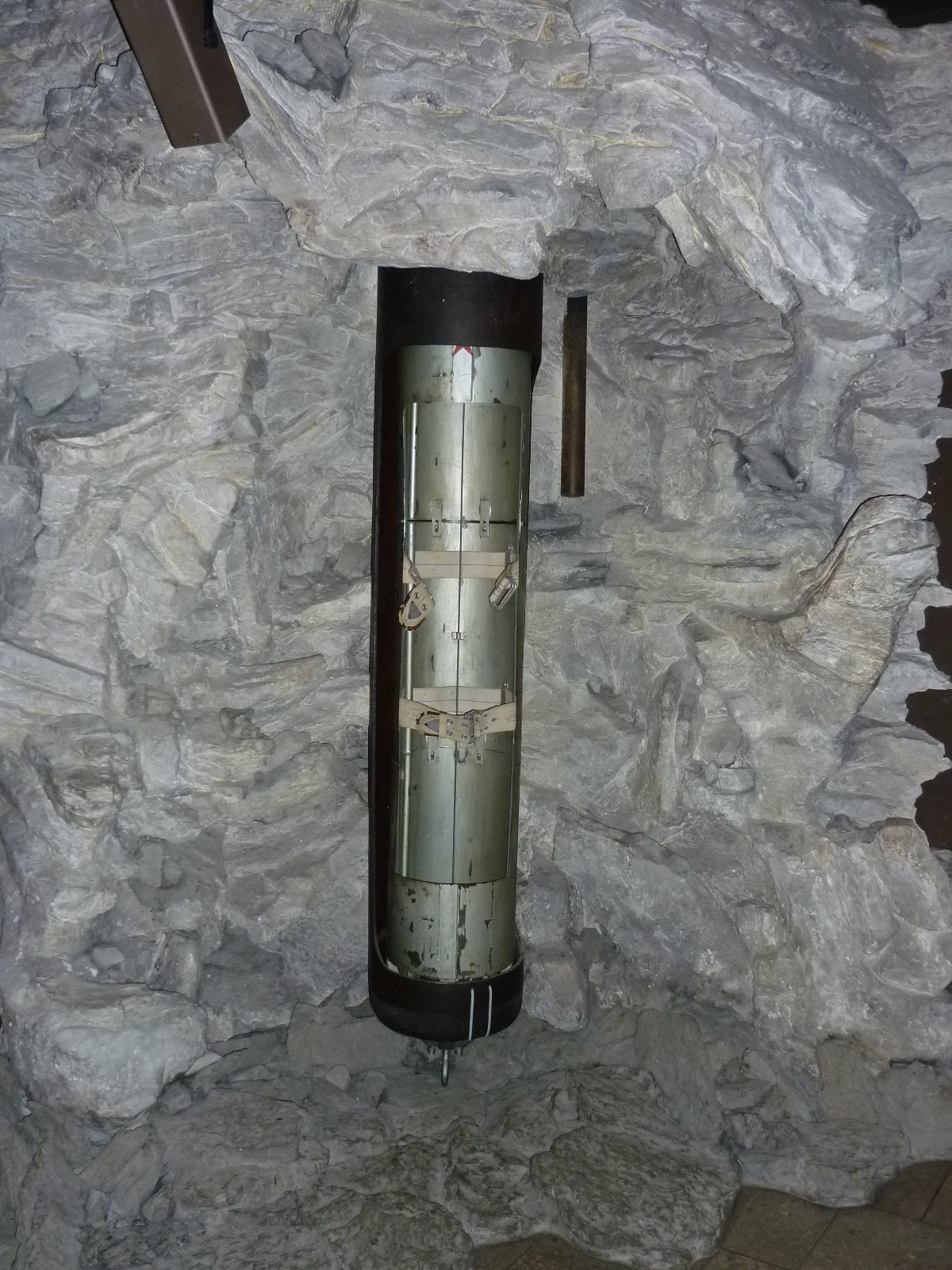
The original German: Dahlbusch Bomb on display at the Deutsches Museum, Munich

There were some harsh discussions about why and whether this last resort had not been suggested earlier. As it was revealed later, rumours about the Alter Mann as a possible refuge had been raised as early as two days after the flooding. However these had not been taken into account till the formal attempt by Hütter. Der Spiegel described some rumours about East German involvement against critics as well a sort of psychological barrier between different hierarchy levels as reason for the late search in the Alter Mann.

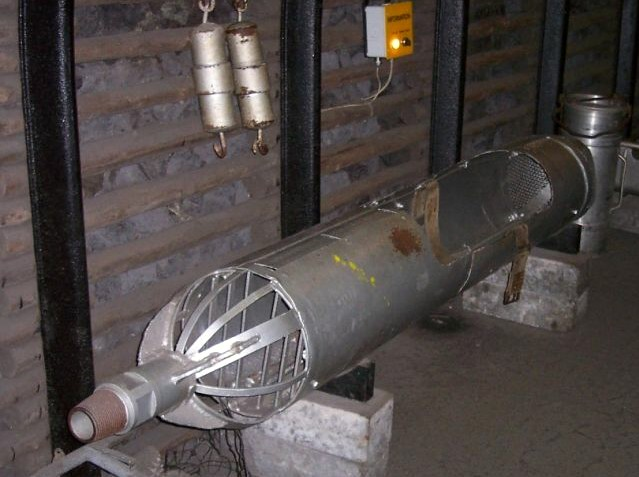
Dahlbusch Bomb mine rescue device

== Media presence ==
The turn of events, with the various dramatic efforts to reach and rescue the survivors, attracted international media attention. There was stiff competition between the 365 press people and 83 journalists and technicians of TV and radio stations. The reporters used fixed telephone lines temporarily provided and leased by the inhabitants of Lengede. Press reporter Gerhard Mauz and his Volkswagen beetle got celebrity status, since he had occupied a central place 50 m away from the borehole and was using the phone line of the local railway station inn to report from the car.

Others, especially press people, were less lucky. A French press journalist, Jean Yves Grandmange was beaten 5 times while attempting interviews. Because special equipment provided by different TV and radio stations was also used to provide communication with the miners, these reporters received privileged access. Chancellor Ludwig Erhard personally visited the mine site and spoke with the miners. Erhard had formally obtained permission from his cabinet members to skip normal duties and visit the site. Over 450 journalists from all over the world were present when the last miners were rescued.

This event, along with the Coronation of Queen Elizabeth II 10 years earlier, became a hallmark for early TV coverage of events with international interest. The rescue was the first significant news story to receive current daily "breaking news" television coverage, and it made watching the Tagesschau a sort of ritual in Western Germany.

== In popular culture ==
In 1969, Rudolf Jugert made the first movie about the events (Das Wunder von Lengede). Several TV documentaries have been shot as well, such as Das Wunder von Lengede oder Ich wünsch' keinem was wir mitgemacht haben in 1979 by ZDF and Das Drama von Lengede, Protokoll einer Katastrophe in 2003 by WDR. In 2003, a two-part television film titled Das Wunder von Lengede (or A Light in Dark Places) was produced by German television station Sat.1. The film was written by Benedikt Röskau based on the recollections of one of the rescued miners. It was directed by Kaspar Heidelbach and featured Heino Ferch, Jan Josef Liefers, Günther Maria Halmer, Heike Makatsch, Axel Prahl, Uwe Rohde, Armin Rohde, Klaus J. Behrendt and Thomas Heinze. It was first broadcast on 9–10 November 2003 and was televised in Sweden, among others. The film won a Grimme Award in 2004.

The television series Thunderbirds (1965–1966), about a rescue organization, was inspired by this disaster.

== See also ==
- 2010 Copiapó mining accident
- Beaconsfield Mine collapse
