= Helmuth Ellgaard =

German illustrator, artist and journalist (1913–1980)

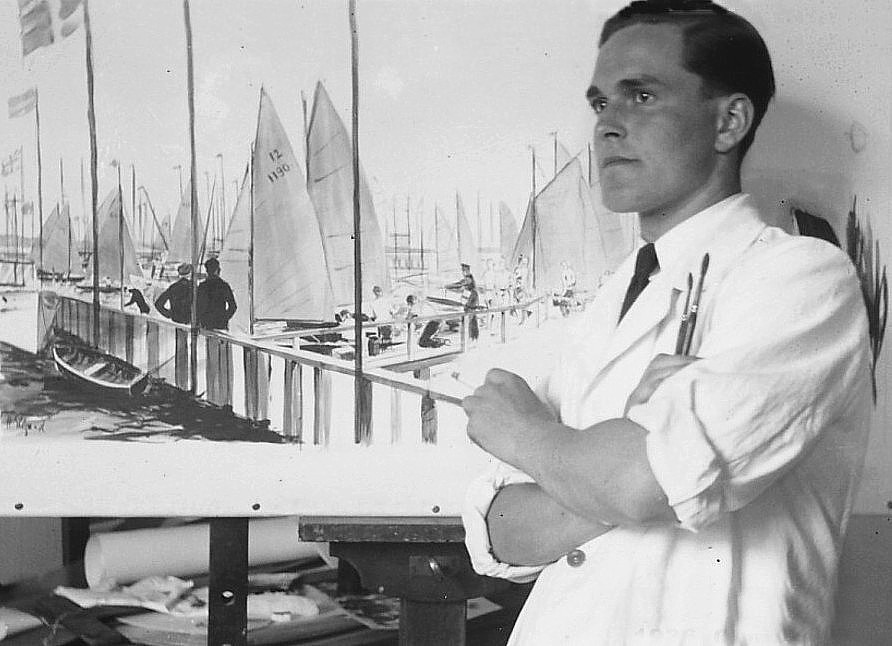
- Born: 3 March 1913; Hadersleben, Germany (now Haderslev, Denmark)
- Died: 22 April 1980 (aged 67); Kiel
- Known for: Illustrations, film posters, war correspondence
- Notable work: Poster for "The Bridge" (Die Brücke)
- Children: Peter Ellgaard; Holger Ellgaard

Helmuth Ellgaard (3 March 1913 in Hadersleben – 22 April 1980 in Kiel) was a German illustrator, artist and journalist.

Helmuth Ellgaard was born in the then German Haderslev/Hadersleben (now in Nordslesvig, Denmark). In 1928, the family left Haderslev, which became Danish after the Schleswig Plebiscites, for Kiel. Soon, Ellgaard caught an interest in drawing and painting. He was educated at the Art academy in Kiel in 1934, while simultaneously working as a news illustrator for the Kieler Neuste Nachrichten newspaper. He also learned to sketch, and his specialty became fast sketches with charcoal.

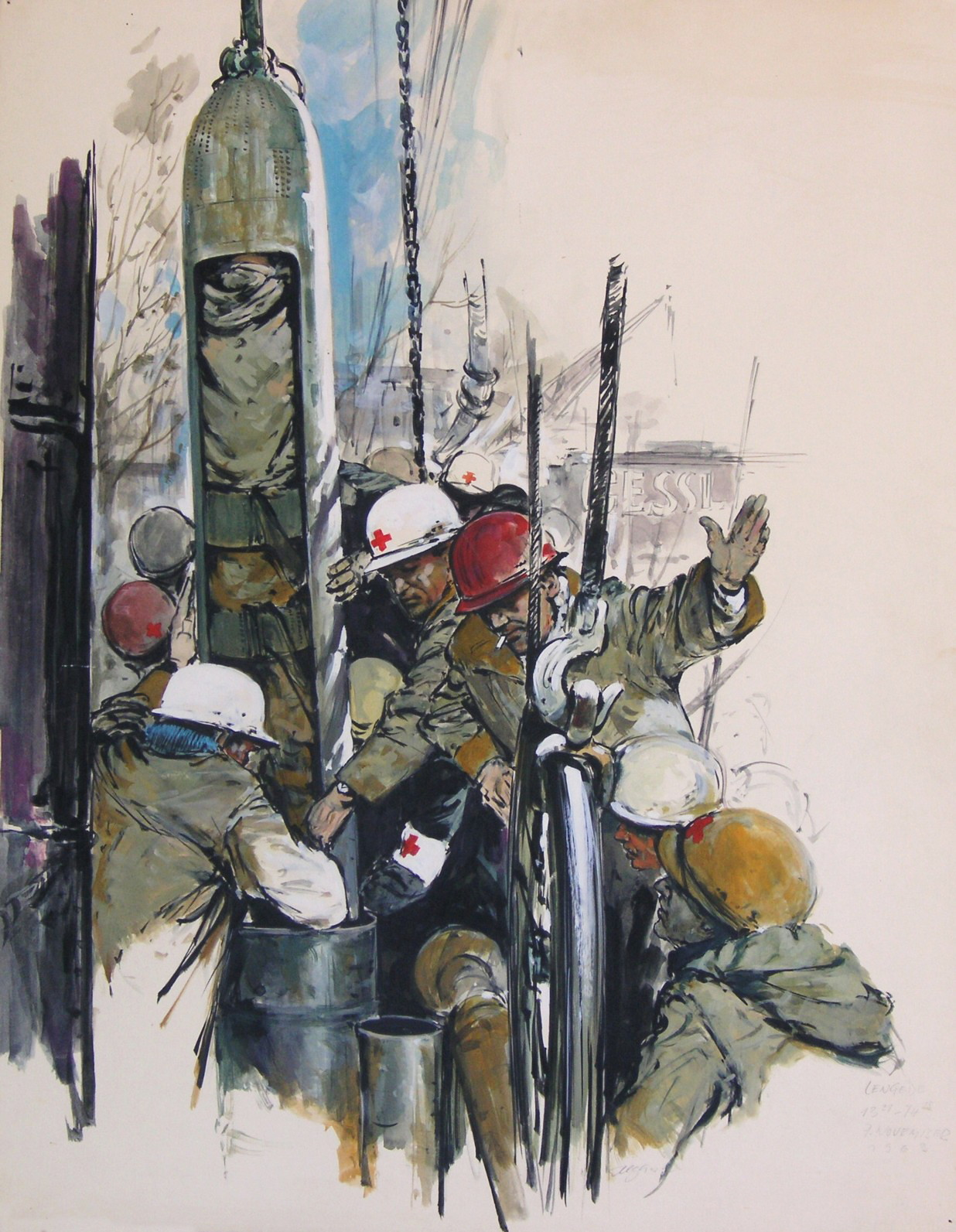
Ellgaard's coverage of the 1963 Wunder von Lengede mining rescue

In 1938 he was newly wed and moved to Berlin. After the outbreak of the Second World War he became a war correspondent, and as a lieutenant in the Luftwaffe he participated in many raids as a journalist, including the Battle of Britain in 1940. His works were published in the renowned weekly magazine Berliner Illustrirte Zeitung. During the war his two sons were born; Peter (1940) and Holger (1943).

The war had destroyed the large publishing houses in Berlin, and new newspapers and magazines were started in Hamburg and Munich among other places. The Ellgaard family therefore moved to Munich, where Helmuth Ellgaard participated in starting the illustrated magazine Revue, which was one of the many new weekly magazines in post-war West Germany. Ellgaard worked as an employee of the editorial staff as an image editor and news illustrator. In almost every issue there were illustrations by him, from 1953 also in color. His role models were the American Norman Rockwell and the Dane Kurt Ard.

In 1956 he chose to become independent, and moved with the family to Hamburg. There he illustrated books and worked for advertising agencies. However, his important work during the period 1954 to 1961 was the illustration of a large number of film posters, of which the poster from 1959 for the anti-war film "The Bridge" (Die Brücke) is considered to be his most notable work. He died of a heart attack in 1980, 67 years old.

In 2003, his two sons Peter and Holger Ellgaard donated a large part of his works to the Haus der Geschichte in Bonn.

== Posters ==
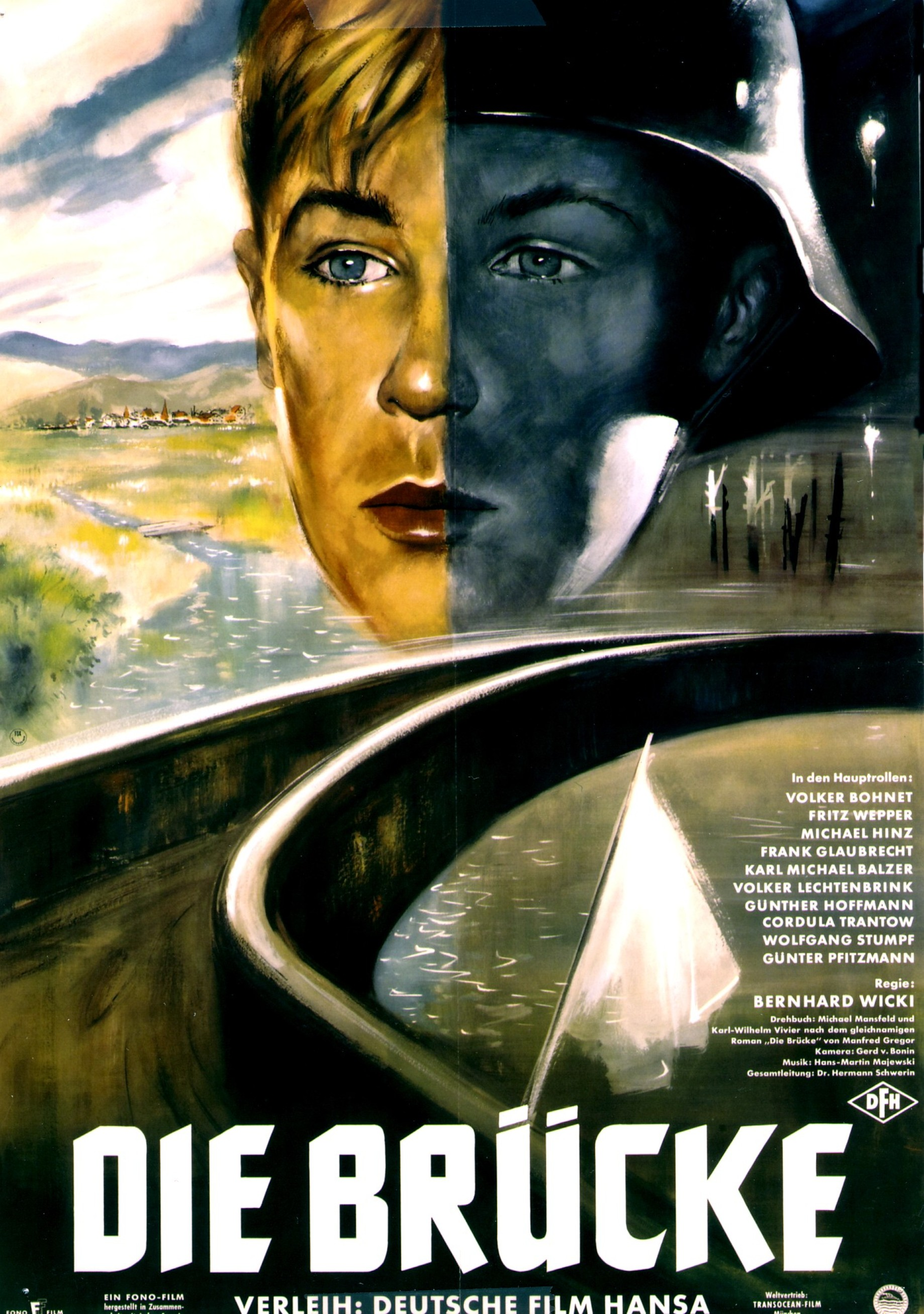
"Die Brücke", 1959

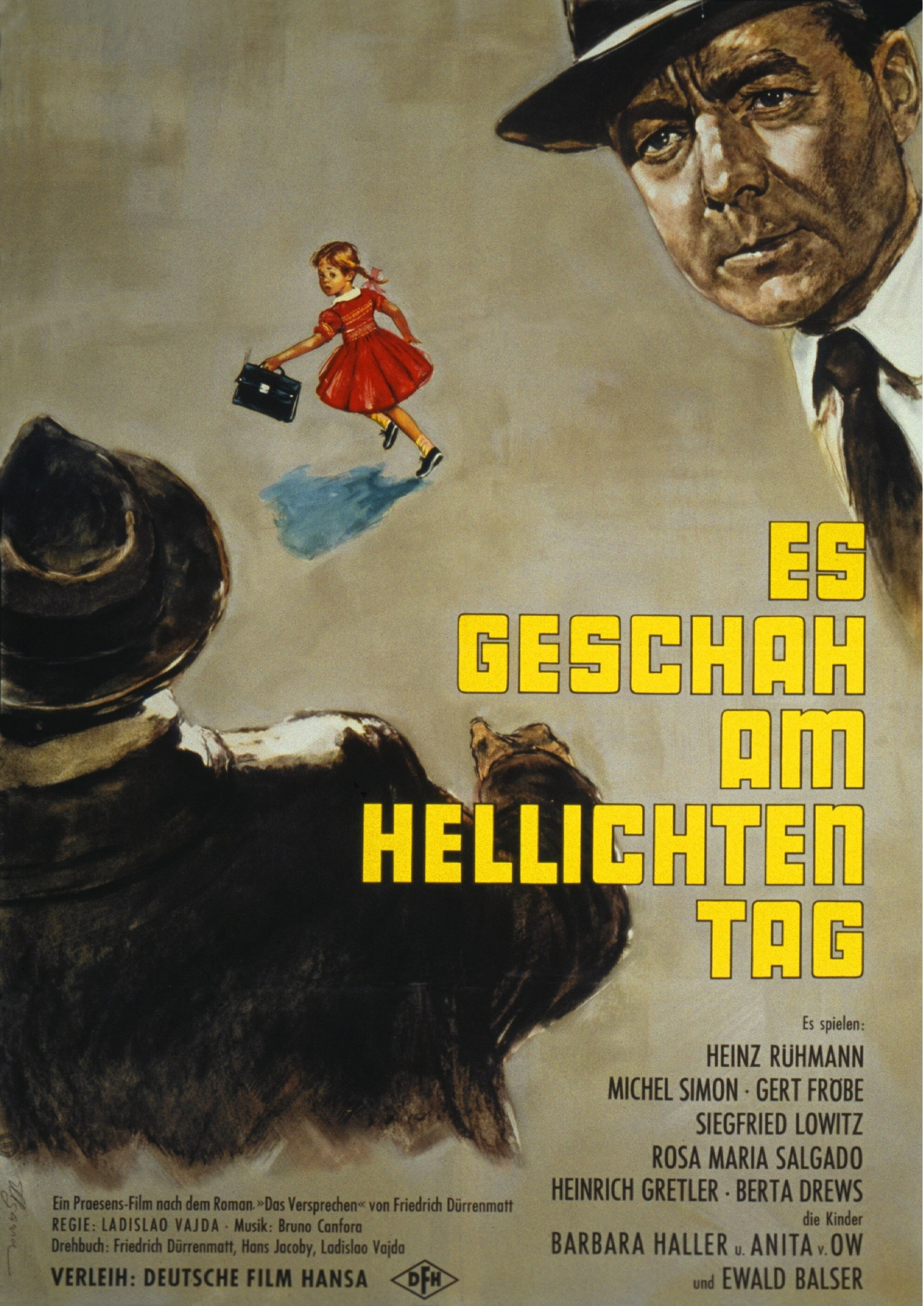
"Es geschah am...", 1959

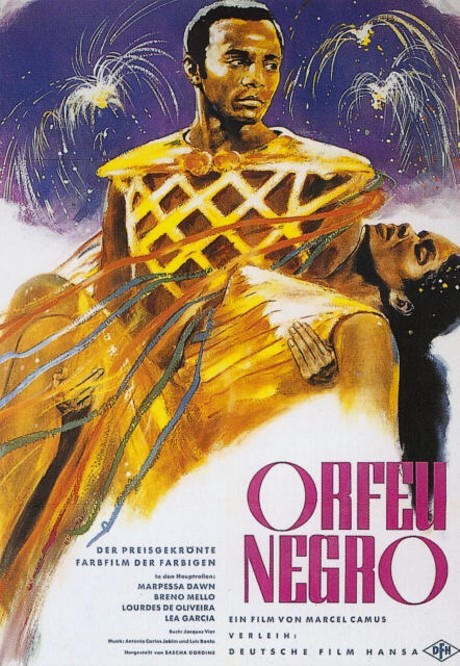
"Orfeu Negro", 1959

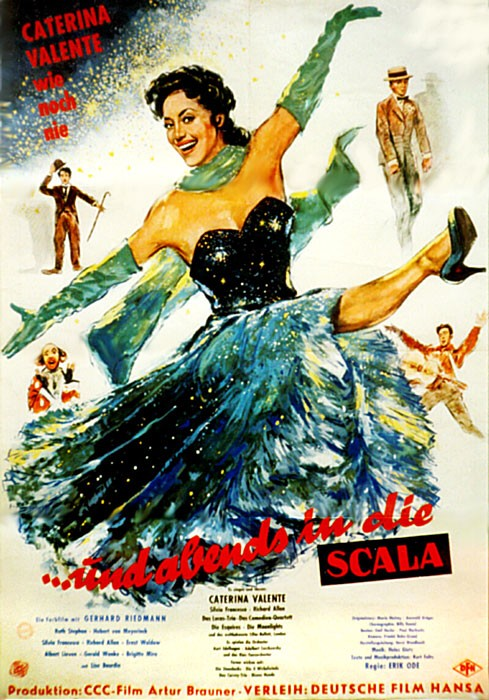
"...abends in die Scala", 1958
