= Dahlbusch Bomb =

Mine emergency evacuation capsule

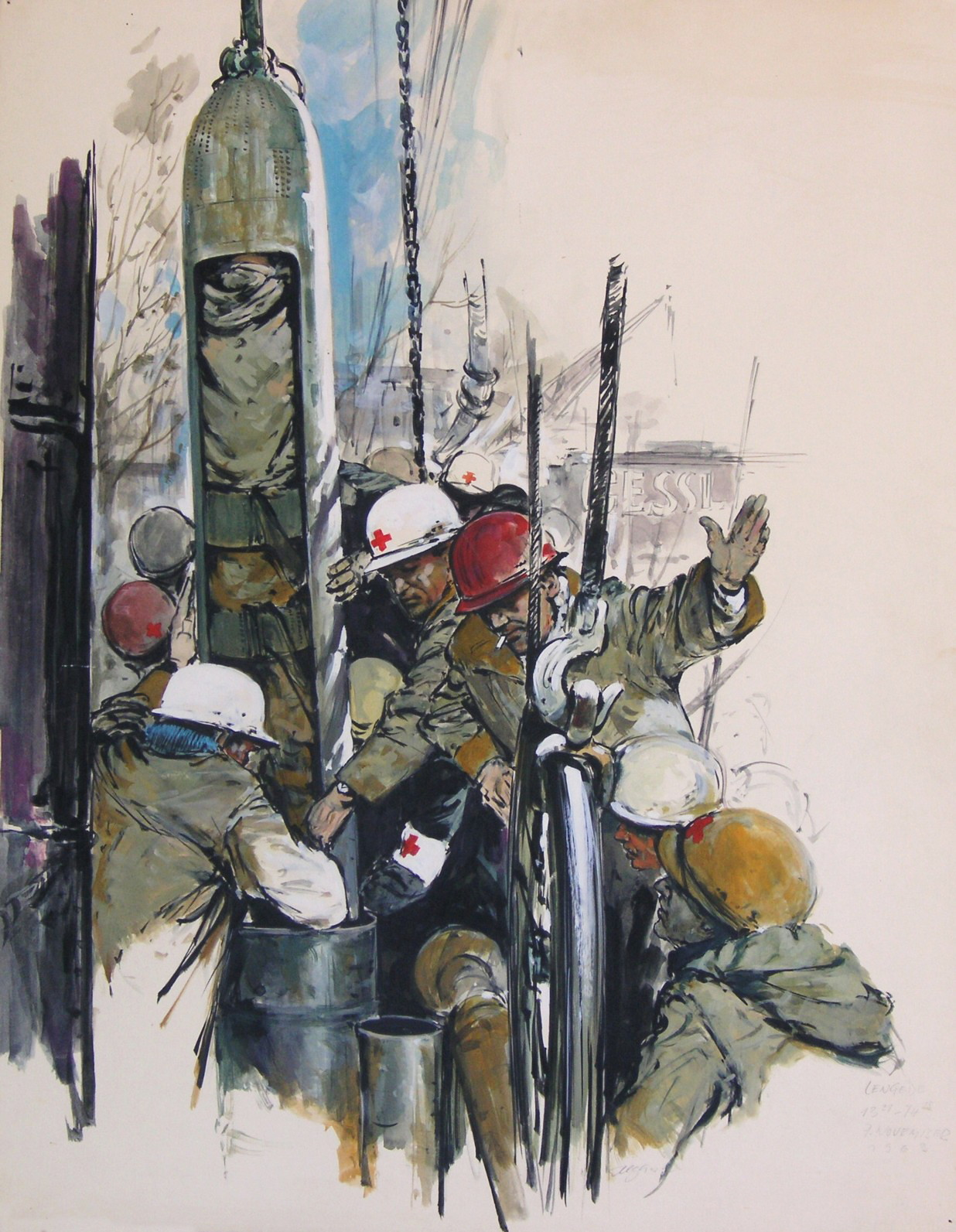
Miner being recovered in a Dahlbusch Bomb in a work of art depicting the Lengede accident.

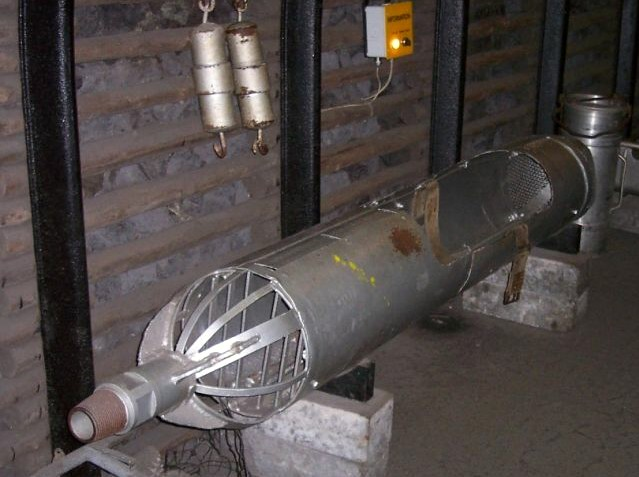
Dahlbusch bomb

A Dahlbusch Bomb is an emergency evacuation device for use in mining. In its original form it is a torpedo-shaped cylinder with a length of 2.5 metres (8.2 ft), developed to transport trapped miners through boreholes after mining accidents. It does not contain explosives: it was called a "bomb" because of its shape.

The Dahlbusch Bomb was developed in May 1955 at the Zeche Dahlbusch coal mine in Gelsenkirchen in Germany's Ruhr area to rescue three miners. Thirty-four-year-old engineer Eberhard Au sketched it on a leaflet. Au, who never applied for a patent, was quoted as saying "the main thing is, the lads get out".^{[1]} Its distinguishing feature was the small diameter of only 38.5 centimetres (15.2 in), which allows miners to be evacuated through significantly smaller boreholes than using other evacuation devices, and whose shape also helps in raising and lowering the device across long distances. At Zeche Dahlbusch, the device was successfully used to rescue three miners, trapped at a depth of 855 metres (2,805 ft) after a mine collapsed, through a vertical borehole drilled 42 metres (138 ft) from the next-higher mine level.

The 15.2-inch diameter would need its passenger to have his shoulders hunched up or his arms vertical above his head, and not be obese or very muscular.

The device was used again in 1956 and 1957, but gained further prominence on 7 November 1963, when eleven miners were rescued after two weeks trapped at a depth of 58 metres (190 ft) in the iron ore mine in Lengede, Germany, in what is known in Germany now as the Wunder von Lengede ("Lengede Miracle").

The "Phoenix" (Fénix) evacuation devices used in the rescue of 33 miners after the 2010 Copiapó mining accident, in Chile, are an enhanced version of the Dahlbusch Bomb.

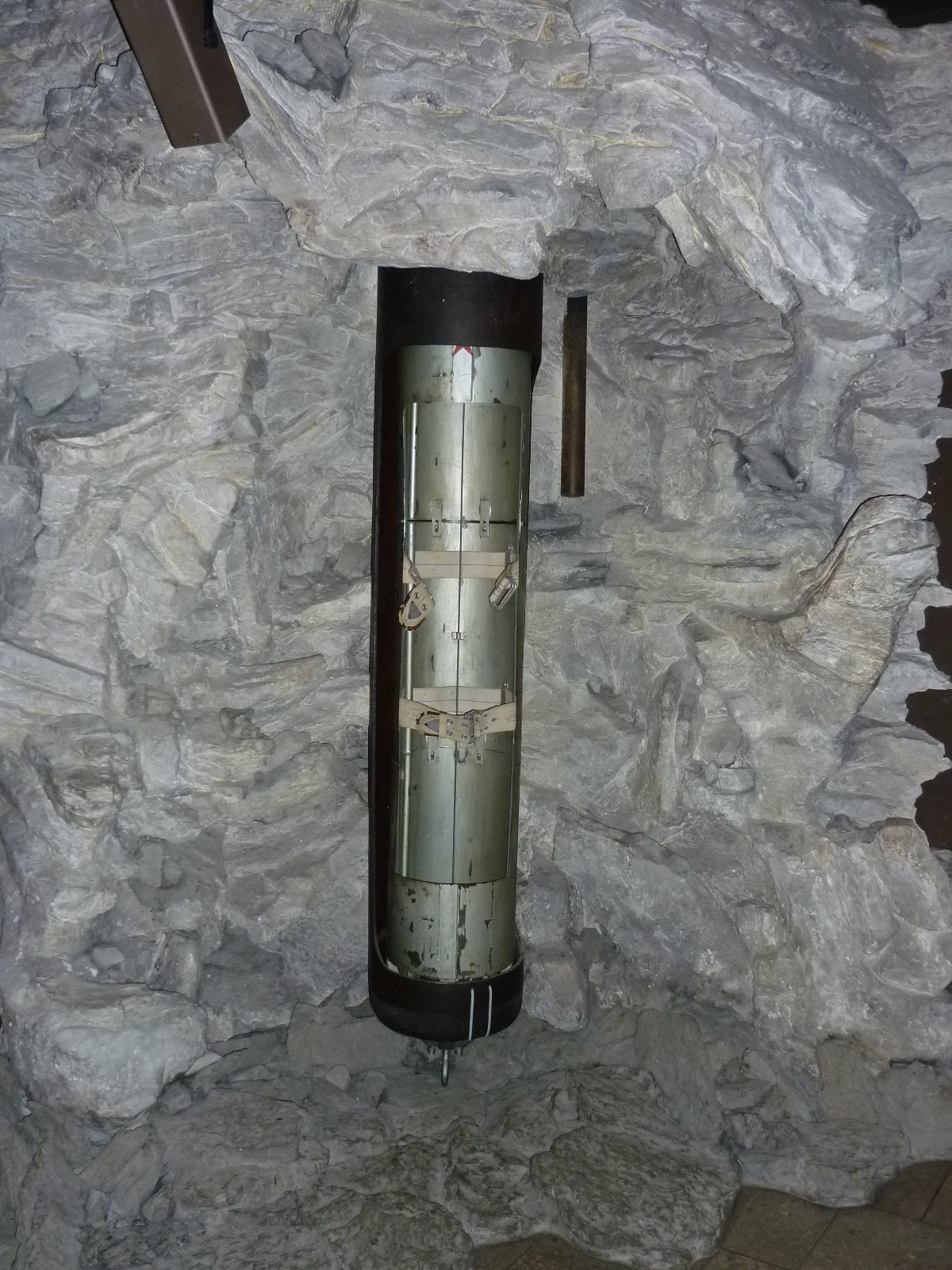
The original Dahlbusch Bomb on display at the Deutsches Museum, Munich

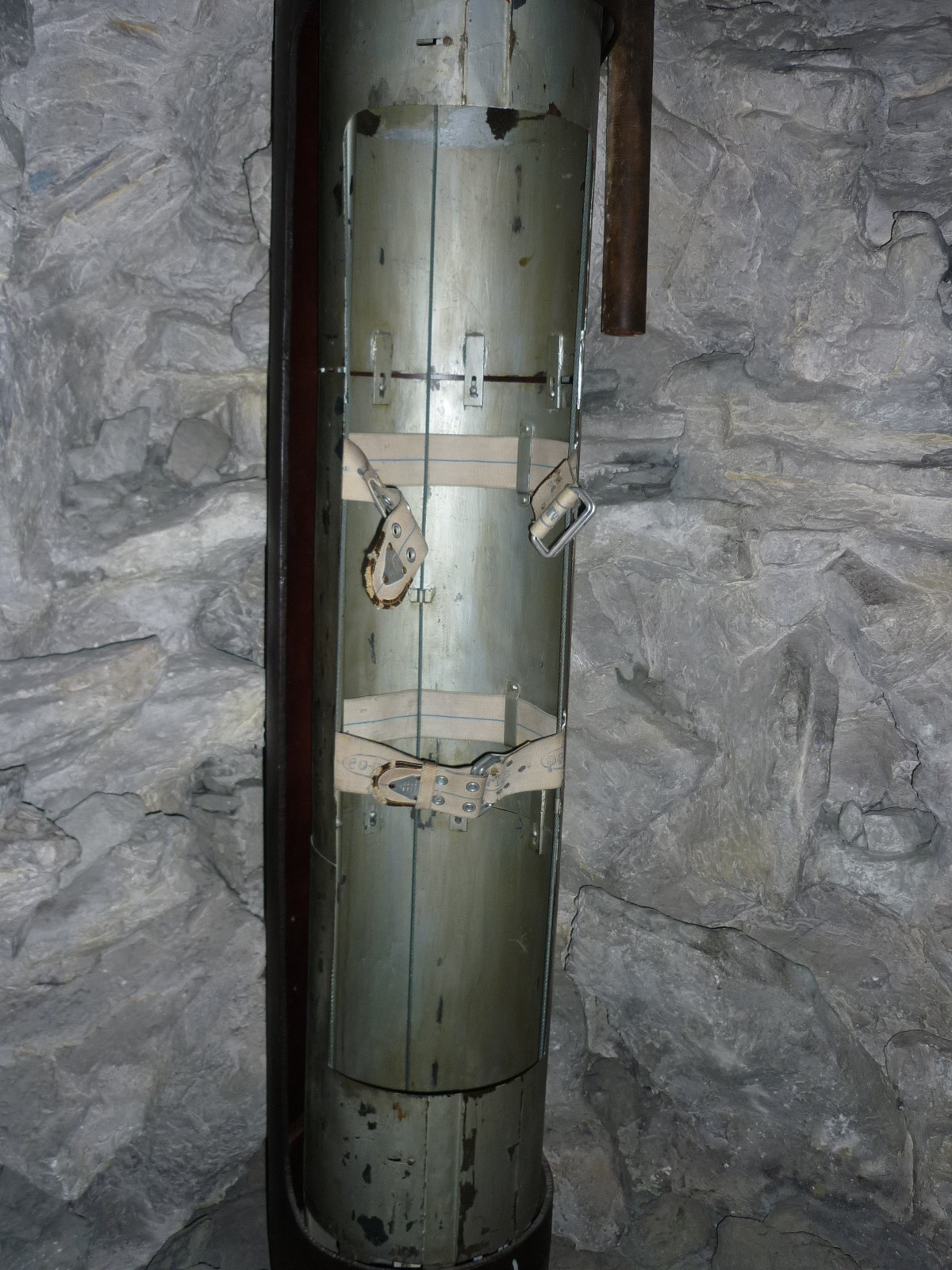
Closeup view
