= Peine (district) =

District in Lower Saxony, Germany

Coordinates: 52°20′N 10°15′E

- District
- Flag Coat of arms
- Country: Germany
- State: Lower Saxony
- Capital: Peine

Government
  - District admin.: Henning Heiß (SPD)

Area
  - Total: 535 km^{2} (207 sq mi)

Population (31 December 2024)
  - Total: 137,045
  - Density: 256/km^{2} (663/sq mi)
- Time zone: UTC+01:00 (CET)
  - Summer (DST): UTC+02:00 (CEST)
- Vehicle registration: PE
- Website: landkreis-peine.de

Peine is a district in Lower Saxony, Germany. It is bounded by (from the south and clockwise) the districts of Hildesheim, Hanover and Gifhorn, and the cities of Brunswick and Salzgitter.

== History ==
Until the early 19th century, the territory of the district belonged to Brunswick-Celle, Brunswick-Wolfenbüttel, and the Bishopric of Hildesheim. After 1815, both Brunswick-Celle and Hildesheim belonged to the Kingdom of Hanover. In 1866, Hanover fell to Prussia. The Prussian administration established districts (Kreise) in 1885, among them Peine.

The region has a smelting tradition, the associated mining tradition lasted until 1976 when the last existing mine was closed. One of the best known events in local history was the mining disaster of Lengede in 1963, when 29 miners died and 11 miners were rescued two weeks after the incident.

== Geography ==
The district comprises the space between the cities of Hanover and Brunswick. The Fuhse river enters the district in the south, runs through the town of Peine and leaves northwards to Celle.

== Coat of arms ==
The coat of arms is derived from the arms of the County of Wolfenbüttel-Asseburg. This county existed only until 1260, but its rulers were responsible for the foundation of Peine.

== Cities and municipalities ==
Clickable map of towns and municipalities in the district

Cities
1. Peine
Municipalities
1. Edemissen
2. Hohenhameln
3. Ilsede
4. Lengede
5. Vechelde
6. Wendeburg

== Notable people from Peine ==
- Hans-Hermann Hoppe, anarcho-capitalist economics professor at the University of Nevada, Las Vegas and a Distinguished Fellow with the Ludwig von Mises Institute

== See also ==
- Metropolitan region Hannover-Braunschweig-Göttingen-Wolfsburg
