= Chilotan architecture =

Architectural style

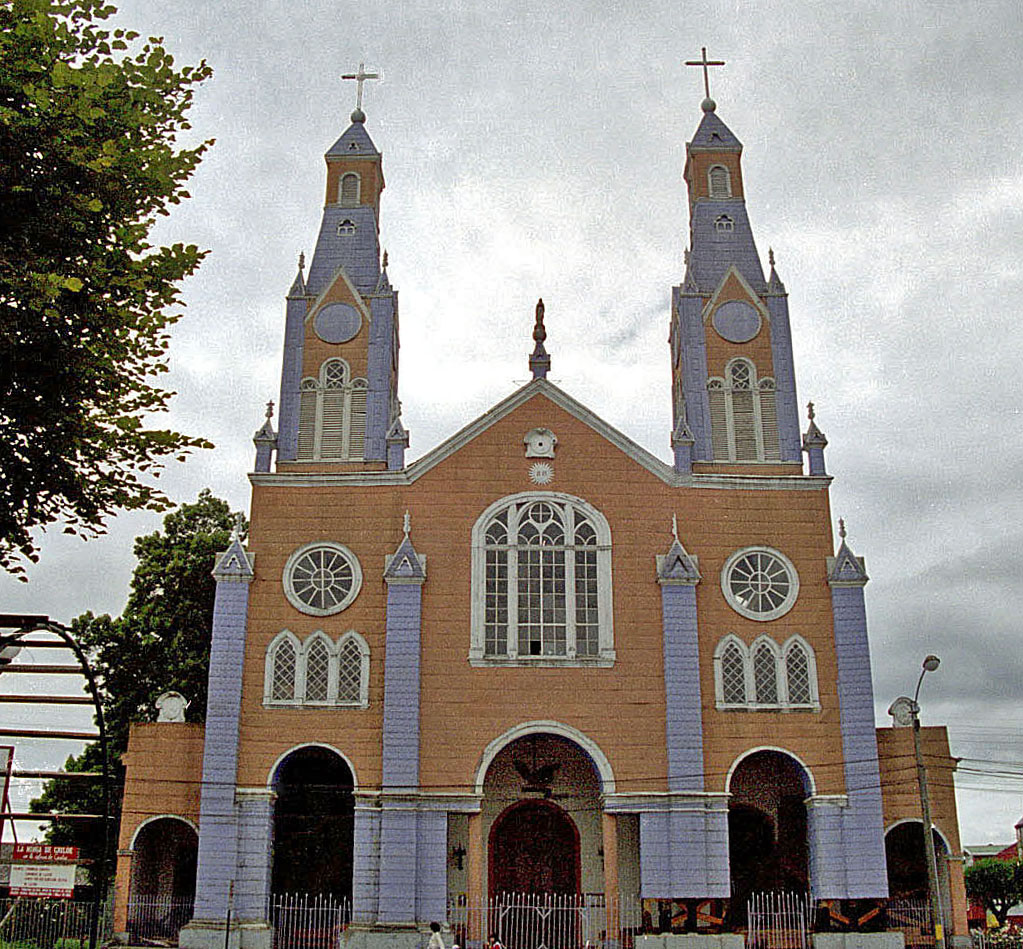
Wooden Church in Castro, Chiloe, Chile

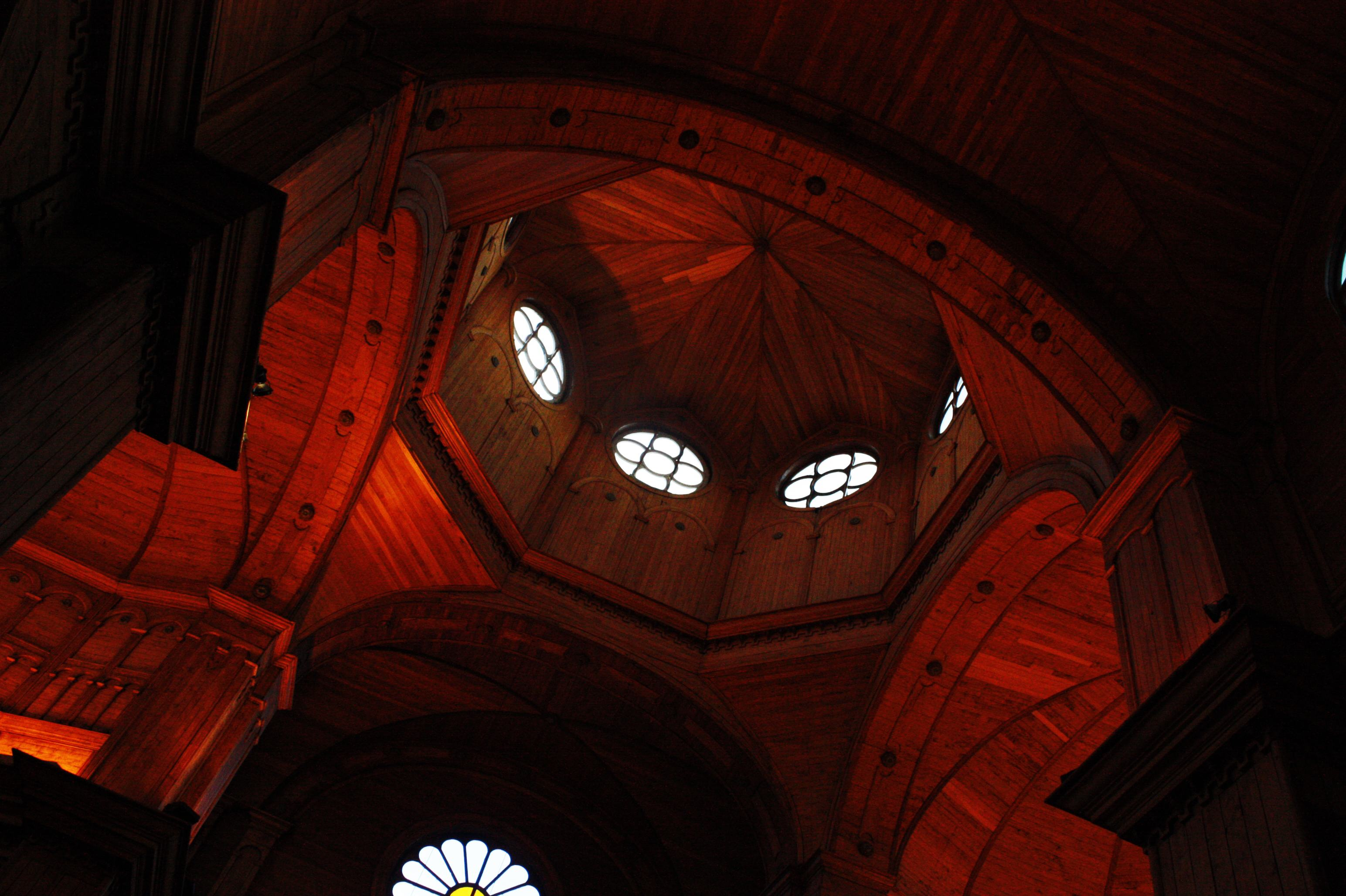
Wooden interior of the Church of San Francisco in Castro.

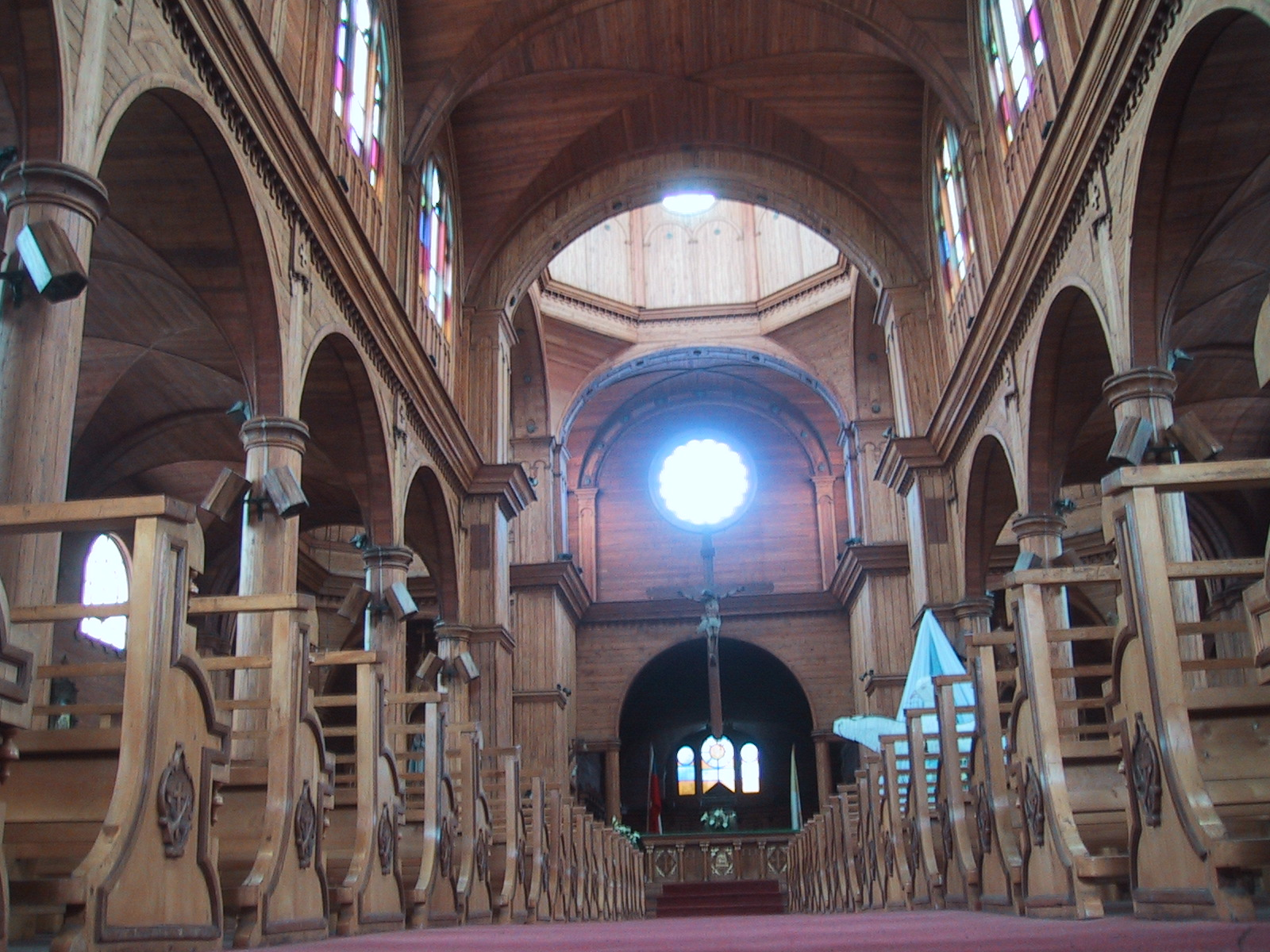
Interior showing wooded arches

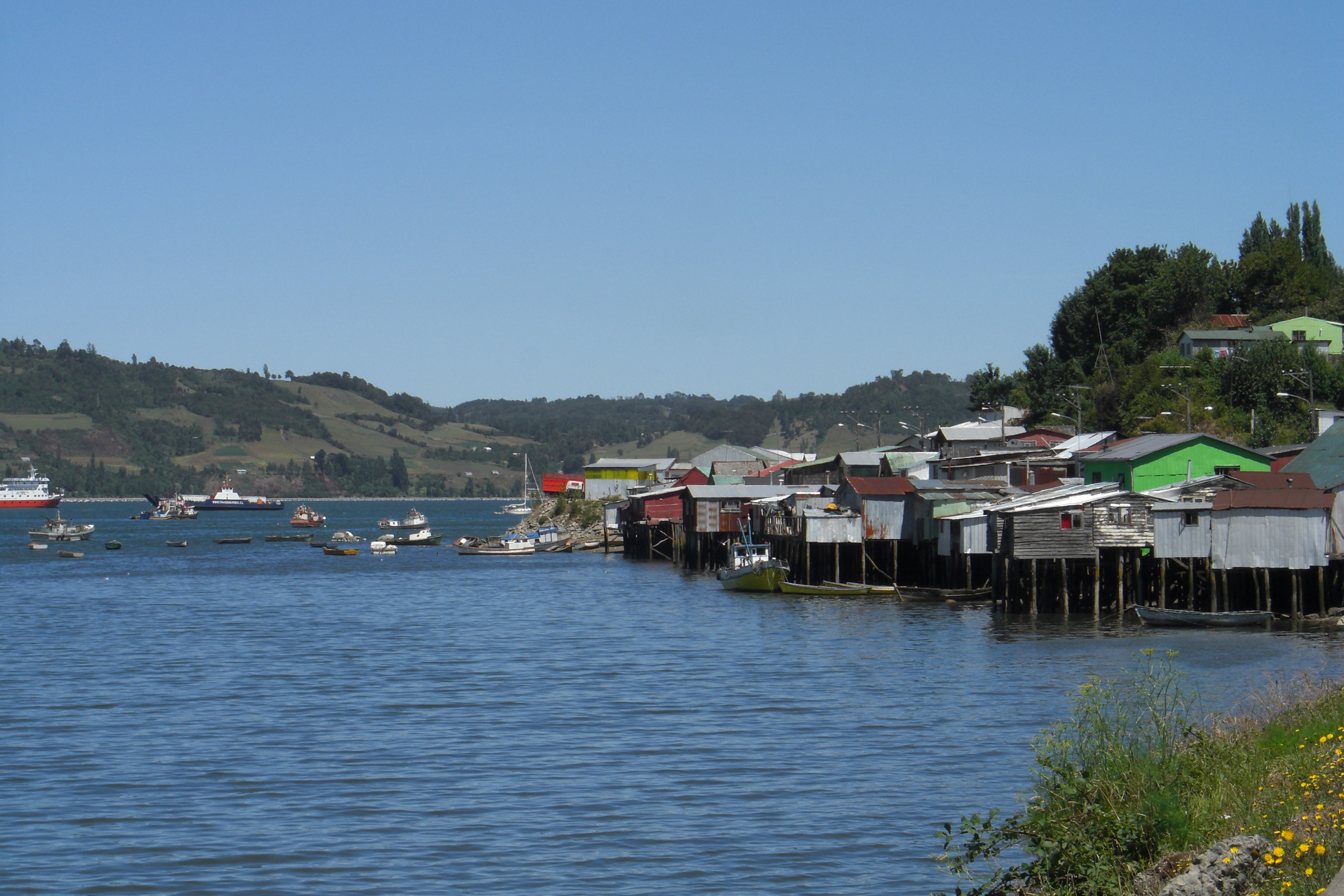
20th century palafitos, at high tide in Castro, Chile.

Chilotan architecture is a unique architectural style that is mainly restricted to the Chiloé Archipelago, and neighboring areas of southern Chile. This style shows the blending of European styles with indigenous building methods and material. Catholic churches built here show the most significant representation of this style, with 16 being designated as UNESCO World Heritage Sites.

== History ==
The Chiloé Archipelago, a group of islands off the West coast of Chile, has a unique colonial architecture that differs substantially from typical Chilean Spanish colonial architecture. These differences are due to both the physical isolation of these islands and their access to different materials, mostly wood.

Spanish colonists arrived in the 16th century and were followed by Jesuit missionaries in the 17th century. The combination of indigenous culture and Jesuit influences led to a mestizo culture and a unique architecture.

=== Spanish Colonial Churches ===
The activities of the Jesuits resulted in the building of 150+ wooden Catholic churches and other religious buildings as a part of the Indian Reductions mandated by the Crown for Spanish colonization of the Americas, 60 of which remain today.

Typical elements of Catholic churches, basilica layout, vaulted ceilings, symmetrical tower facades, and arched entrances, are presented in these churches but without the recognizable material stone. Instead, locals built these churches entirely out of wood, using ship-building techniques. Even fasteners and other typically metal connections were made with wood. These churches were mostly placed along the coastline to serve as navigational aids for sailors.

=== Houses and other buildings ===
Wood is the main building material in all Chilotan architecture and many different species are used for different reasons. Cypress, mañio, ulmo, plum, coigue, and larch, or fitzroya wood are the most commonly used. Ulmo wood is primarily used for structural elements and fitzroya was often used for shingles due to its good properties to resist moisture and other environmental factors. Used in both churches and houses, it became a very recognizable material for its rich color. The roof shingles of fitzroya came to be used as money and called Real de Alerce.

Palafitos, or stilt houses are a staple in Chiloe. These houses typically consist of a base of stilts or piles, with a gable roof and a central kitchen to help heat the entire home. The reason for these houses being built into the water was to accommodate fishing, a large part of Chilotan culture. This style is observed in other parts of the world, however, the longevity of these houses is notably higher in Chiloe, primarily due to the properties of the wood available in the area.

== See also ==
- Churches of Chiloé
- History of Chiloé
- Plan Serena
