= Spanish colonial architecture =

Architectural style present in regions colonized by Spain in the 14th-18th centuries

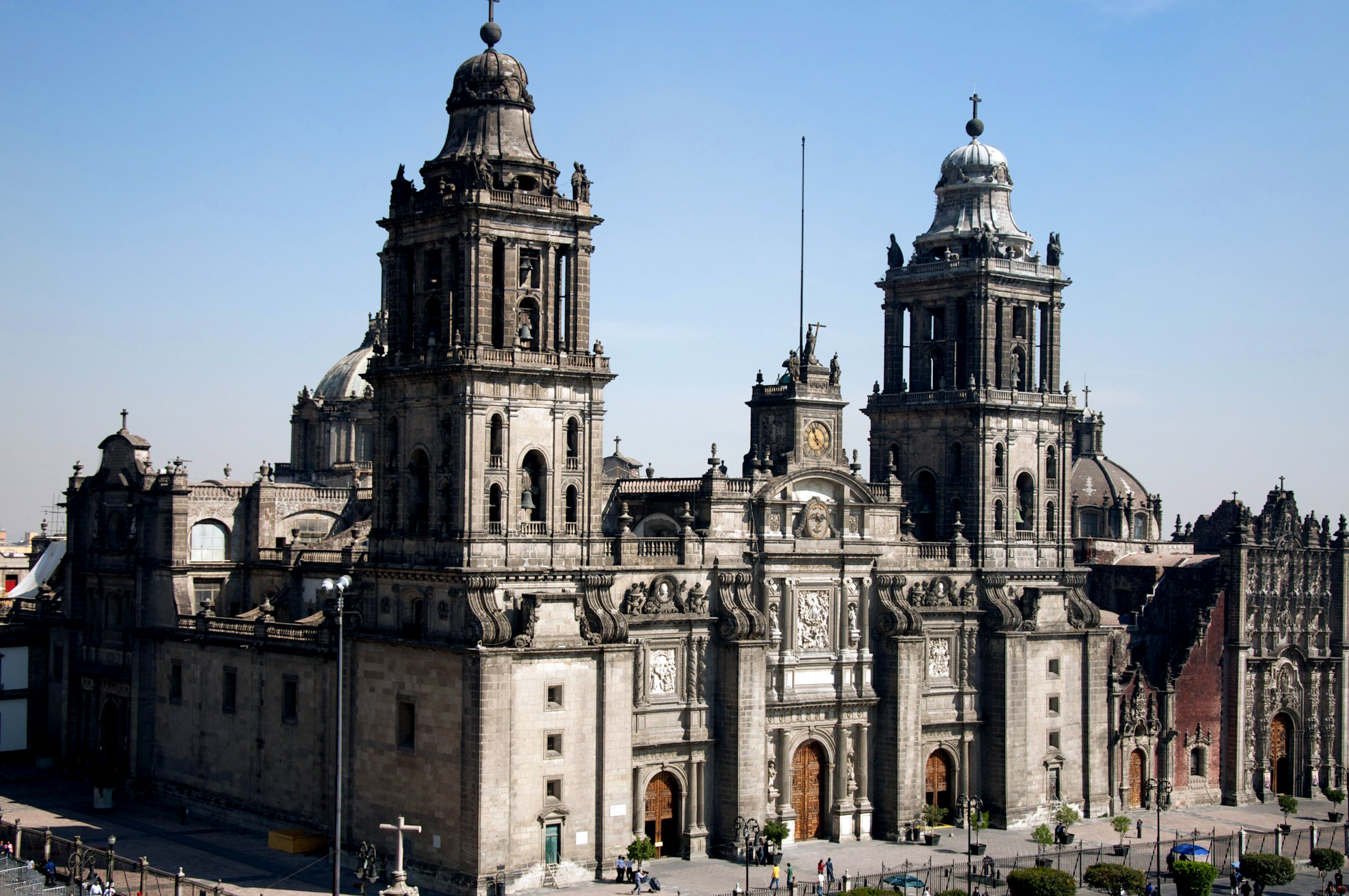
The colonial Cathedral of Mexico City

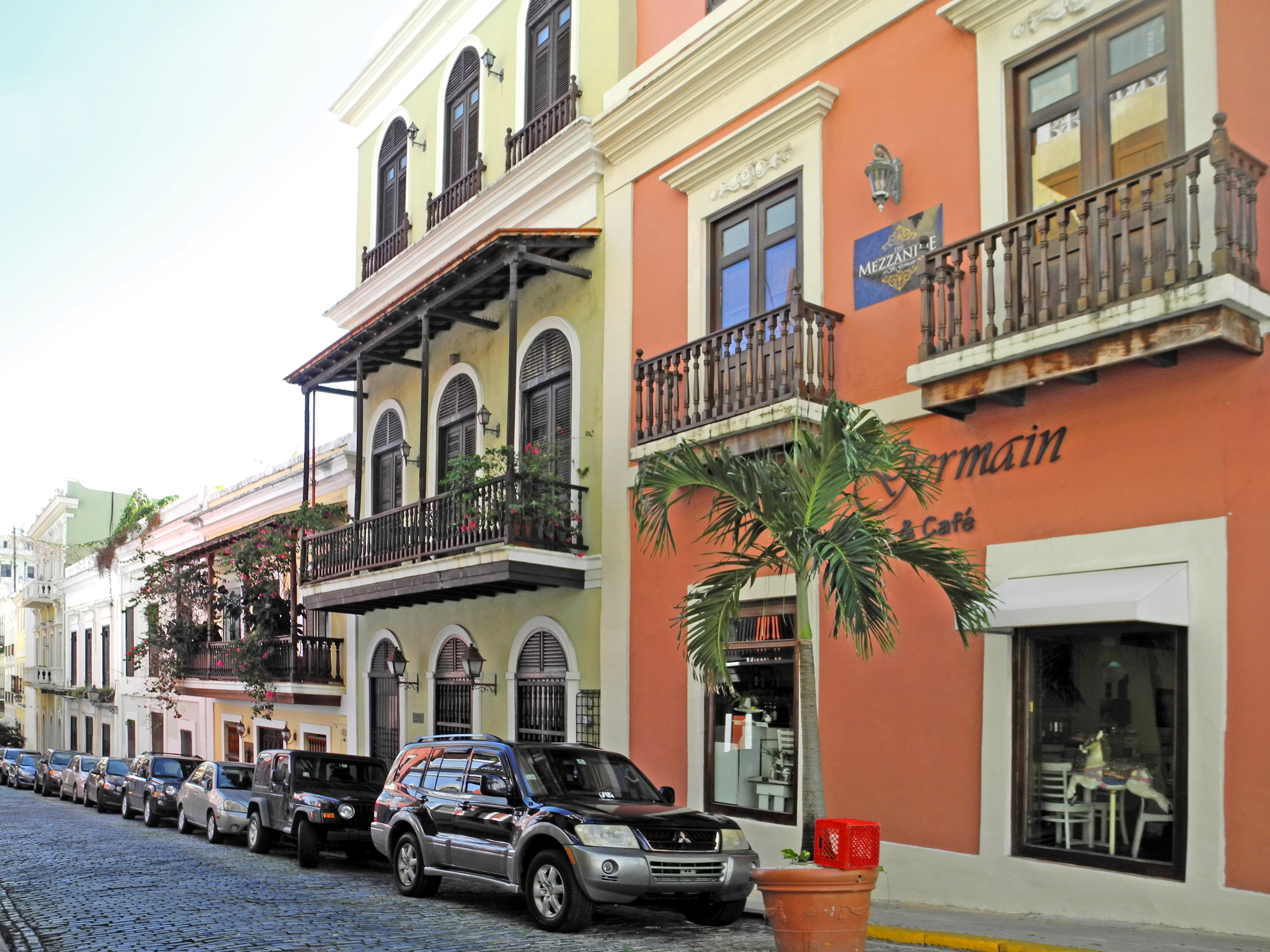
Spanish styles in Old San Juan, Puerto Rico

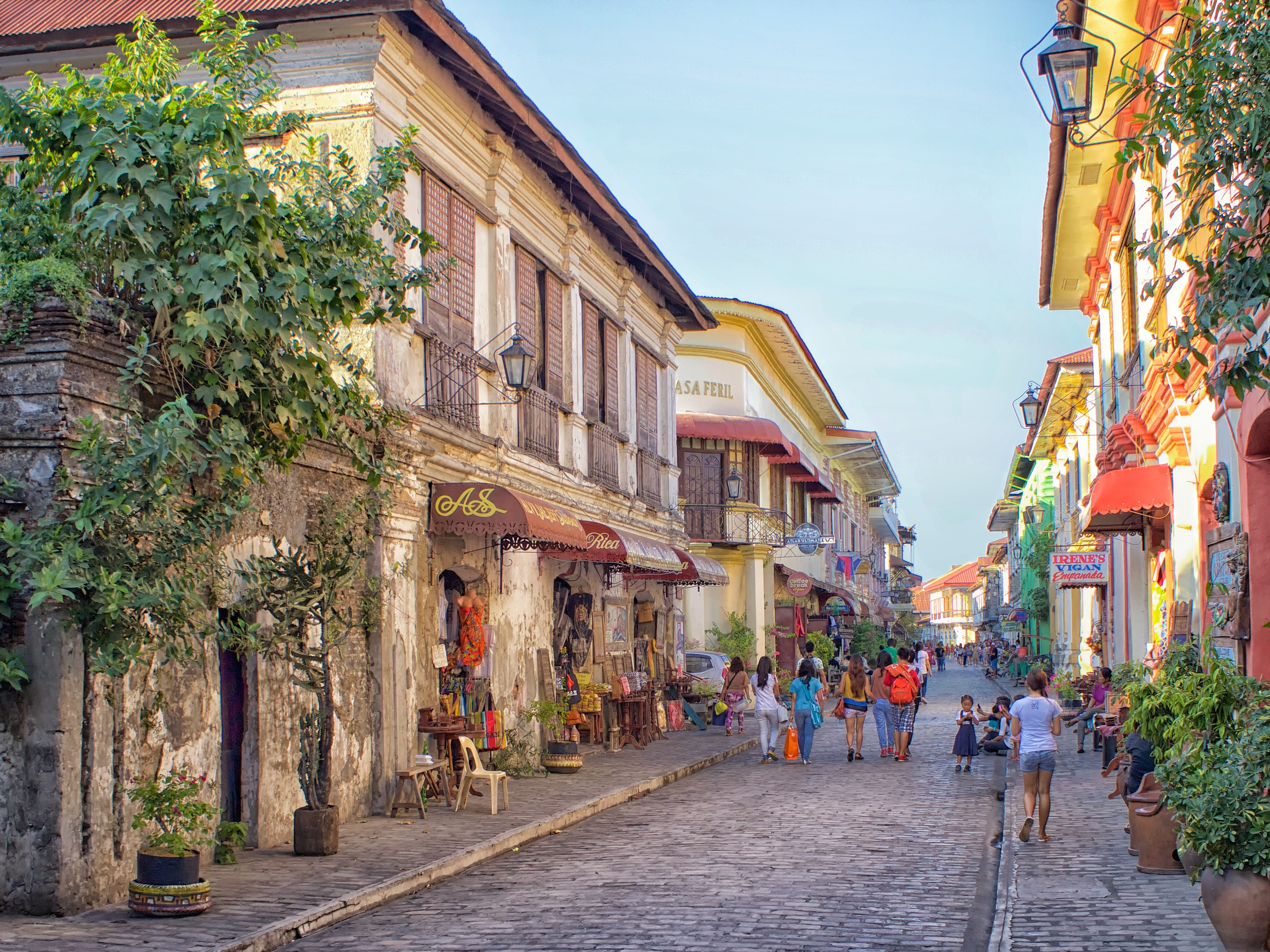
Calle Crisologo of Vigan, Ilocos Sur, Philippines

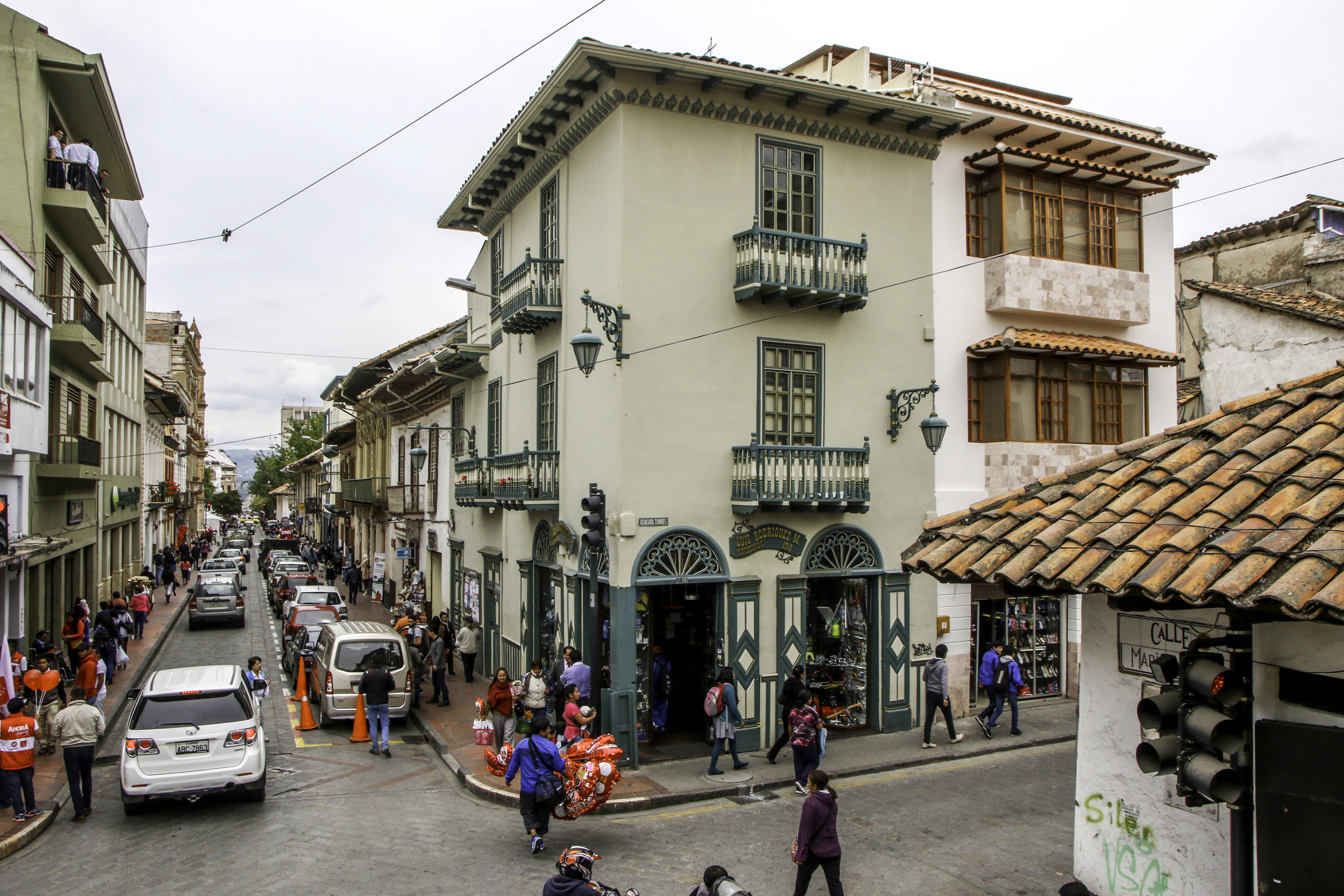
Historic center in Cuenca, Ecuador

Spanish colonial architecture, also known as Hispanic colonial architecture, represents Spanish colonial influence on the cities and towns of its former colonies, and is still seen in the architecture as well as in the city planning aspects of conserved present-day cities. These two visible aspects of the city are connected and complementary. The 16th-century Laws of the Indies included provisions for the layout of new colonial settlements in the Americas and elsewhere.

To achieve the desired effect of inspiring awe among the Indigenous peoples of the Americas as well as creating a legible and militarily manageable landscape, the early colonizers used and placed the new architecture within planned townscapes and mission compounds.

The new churches and mission stations, for example, aimed for maximum effect in terms of their imposition and domination of the surrounding buildings or countryside. In order for that to be achievable, they had to be strategically located – at the center of a town square (plaza) or at a higher point in the landscape. These elements are common and can also be found in almost every city and town in Spain.

The Spanish colonial style of architecture dominated in the early Spanish colonies of North and South America, and were also somewhat visible in its other colonies. It is sometimes marked by the contrast between the simple, solid construction demanded by the new environment and the Baroque ornamentation exported from Spain.

Mexico, as the center of New Spain—and the richest province of Spain's colonial empire—has some of the most renowned buildings built in this style. With twenty-nine sites, Mexico has more sites on the UNESCO World Heritage list than any other country in the Americas, many of them boasting some of the richest Spanish colonial architecture. Some of the most famous cities in Mexico built in the Colonial style are Puebla, Zacatecas, Querétaro, Guanajuato, and Morelia.

The historic center of Mexico City is a mixture of architectural styles from the 16th century to the present. The Metropolitan Cathedral was built from 1563 to 1813 using a variety of styles including the Renaissance, Baroque, and Neoclassical. The rich interior is mostly Baroque. Other examples are the Palacio Nacional, the restored 18th-century Palacio de Iturbide, the 16th-century Casa de los Azulejos – clad with 18th-century blue-and-white talavera tiles, and many more churches, cathedrals, museums, and palaces of the elite.

Between the late 17th century and 1750, one of Mexico's most popular architectural styles was Mexican Churrigueresque. These buildings were built in an ultra-Baroque, with details fantastically extravagant and visually frenetic. Antigua Guatemala in Guatemala is also known for its well-preserved Spanish colonial style architecture. The city of Antigua is famous for its well-preserved Spanish Mudéjar-influenced Baroque architecture as well as a number of spectacular ruins of colonial churches dating from the 16th century. It has been designated a UNESCO World Heritage Site.

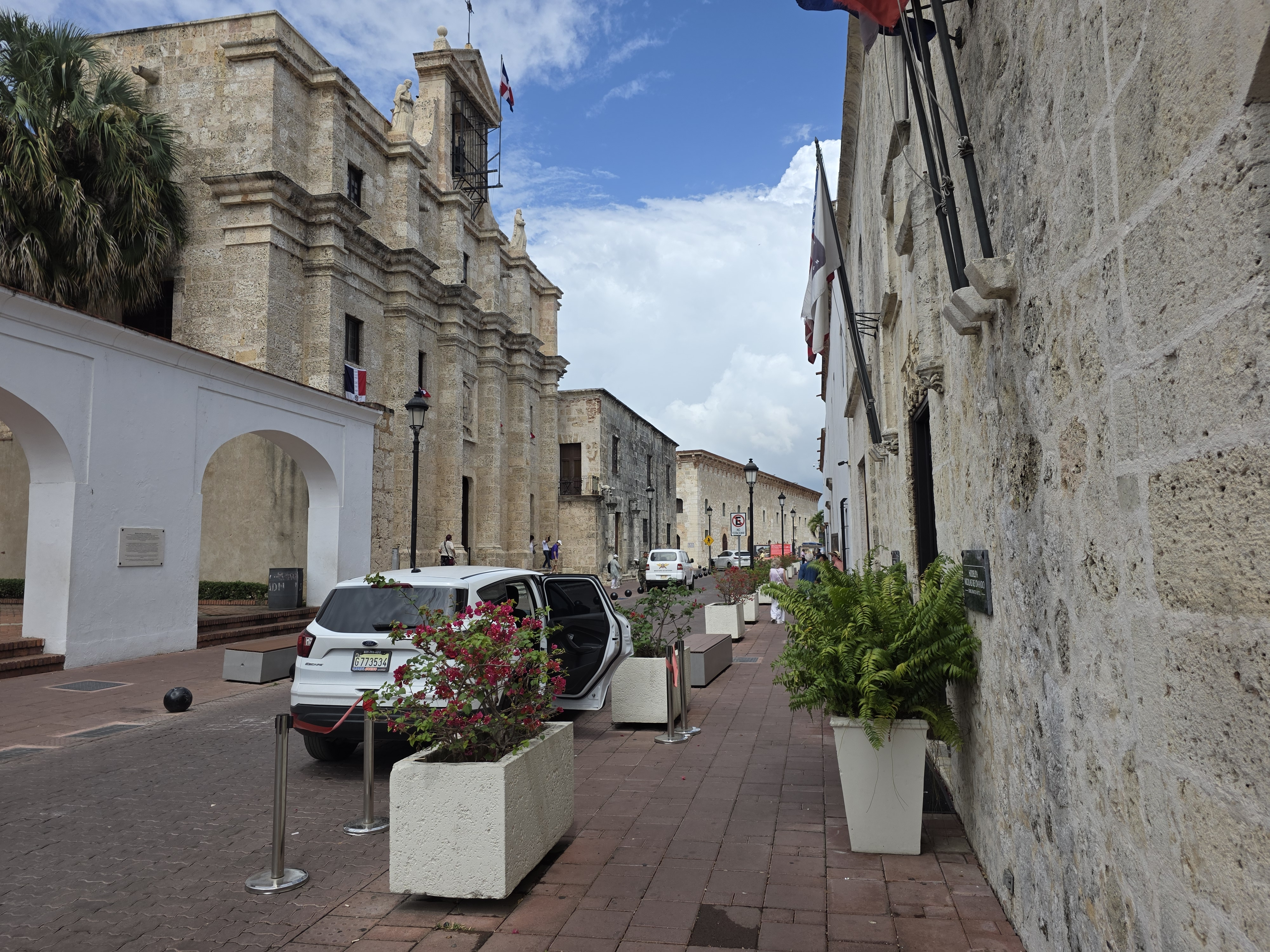
Ciudad Colonial in Santo Domingo, the oldest European-founded city in the Americas.

The Santo Domingo im Dominican Republic, founded in 1502, is the oldest continuously inhabited European-established city in the Americas and an early example of Spanish colonial urban planning in the New World. Its grid layout and stone buildings influenced the development of other colonial settlements that followed. The area, recognized as a UNESCO World Heritage Site, preserves important landmarks such as the first cathedral, hospital, and fortress built in the Americas, reflecting the beginnings of Spanish colonial architecture in the region. Other cities in Latin America founded by the Spanish Empire during the early 16th century preserving Spanish colonial architecture with UNESCO World Heritage Site status include Havana in Cuba, San Juan in Puerto Rico, Cartagena in Colombia, and Coro in Venezuela.

St. Augustine, the first continuously European-occupied city in North America, was established in 1565. Beginning in 1598, quarried coquina from Anastasia Island contributed to a new colonial style of architecture in this city. Coquina is a limestone conglomerate, containing small shells of mollusks. It was used in the construction of residential homes, the City Gate, the Cathedral Basilica, the Castillo de San Marcos, and Fort Matanzas.

According to UNESCO, Quito, Ecuador, has the best-preserved, and least-altered historic centre (320 hectares) in Latin America, despite several earthquakes. The historic district of this city is the best preserved area of Spanish colonial architecture in the Southern Hemisphere.

== History of the city grid in the New World ==
The idea of laying out a city in a grid pattern is not unique to the Spanish. In fact, it never started out with the Spanish colonizers but they implemented it in hundreds of cities in the Americas and Asia. It has been traced back to some ancient civilizations especially the ancient cities of the Aztec and Maya, and also Ancient Greeks. The idea was spread by the Roman conquest of European empires and its ideas were adopted by other civilizations. It was popularized at different paces and in different levels throughout the Renaissance—the French took to building grid-like villages (ville-neuves) and the English under King Edward I did as well. Some argue, however, that Spain was not part of this movement to order towns as grids. Despite its clear military advantage, and despite the knowledge of city planning, the New World settlements of the Spanish actually grew amorphously for some three to four decades before they turned to grids and city plans as ways of organizing space. In contrast to the orders given much later on how the city should be laid out, Ferdinand II did not give specific instructions for how to build the new settlements in the Caribbeans. To Nicolas De Ovando, he said the following in 1501:

As it is necessary in the island of Española to make settlements and from here it is not possible to give precise instructions, investigate the possible sites, and in conformity with the quality of the land and sites as well as with the present population outside present settlements establish settlements in the numbers and in the places that seem proper to you.

== City planning: a royal ordinance ==
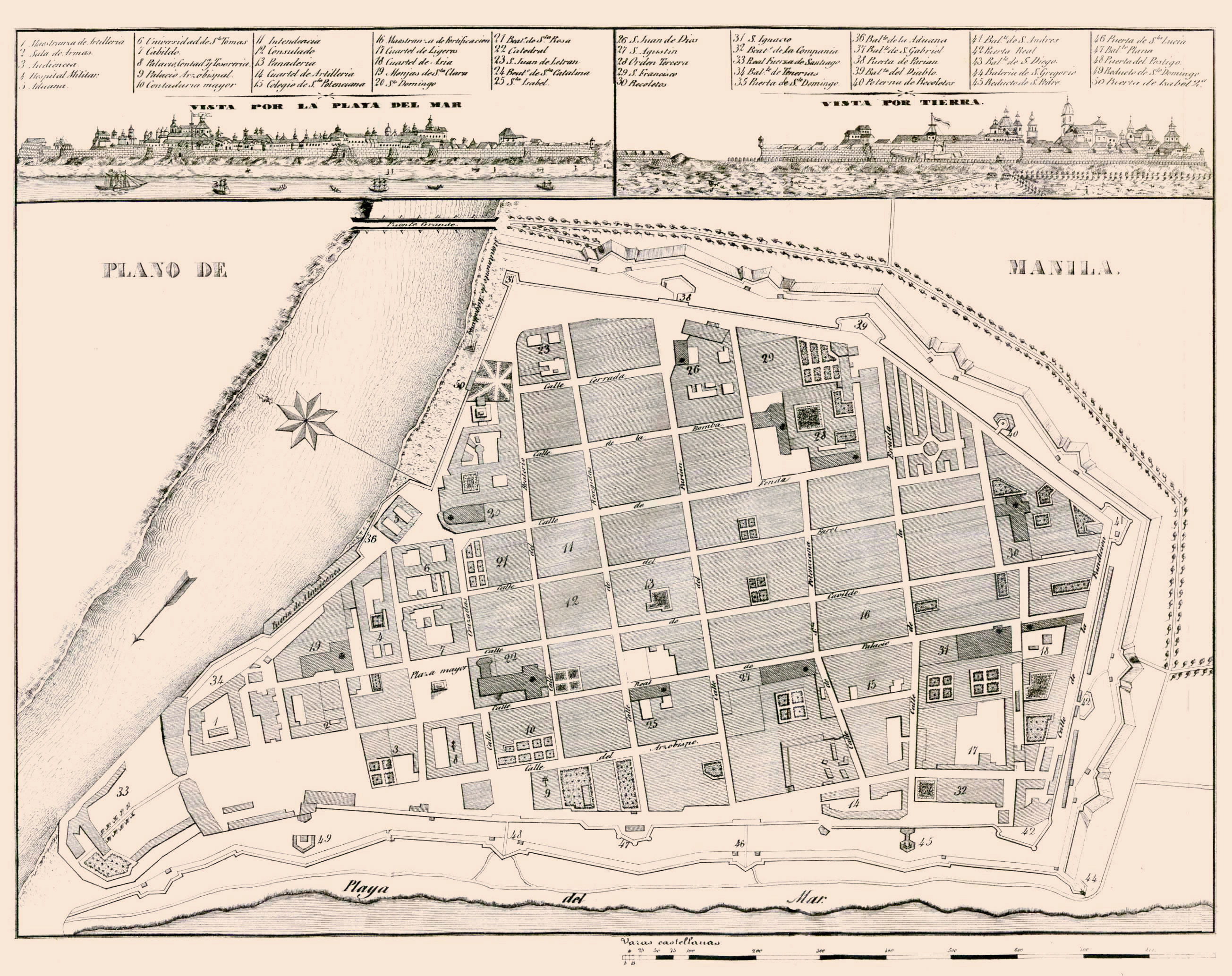
Map of the walled city of Intramuros in Manila with elements of colonial planning called Laws of the Indies present

In 1513 the monarchs wrote out a set of guidelines that ordained the conduct of Spaniards in the New World as well as that of the Indians that they found there. With regards to city planning, these ordinances had details on the preferred location of a new town and its location relative to the sea, mountains and rivers. It also detailed the shape and measurements of the central plaza taking into account the spacing for purposes of trade as well as the spacing for purposes of festivities or even military operations—occasions that involved horse-riding. In addition to specifying the location of the church, the orientation of roads that run into the main plaza as well as the width of the street with respect to climatic conditions, the guidelines also specified the order in which the city must be built.

The building lots and the structures erected thereon are to be so situated that in the living rooms one can enjoy air from the south and from the north, which are the best. All town homes are to be so planned that they can serve as a defense or fortress against those who might attempt to create disturbances or occupy the town. Each house is to be so constructed that horses and household animals can be kept therein, the courtyards and stockyards being as large as possible to insure health and cleanliness.

== La Traza ==
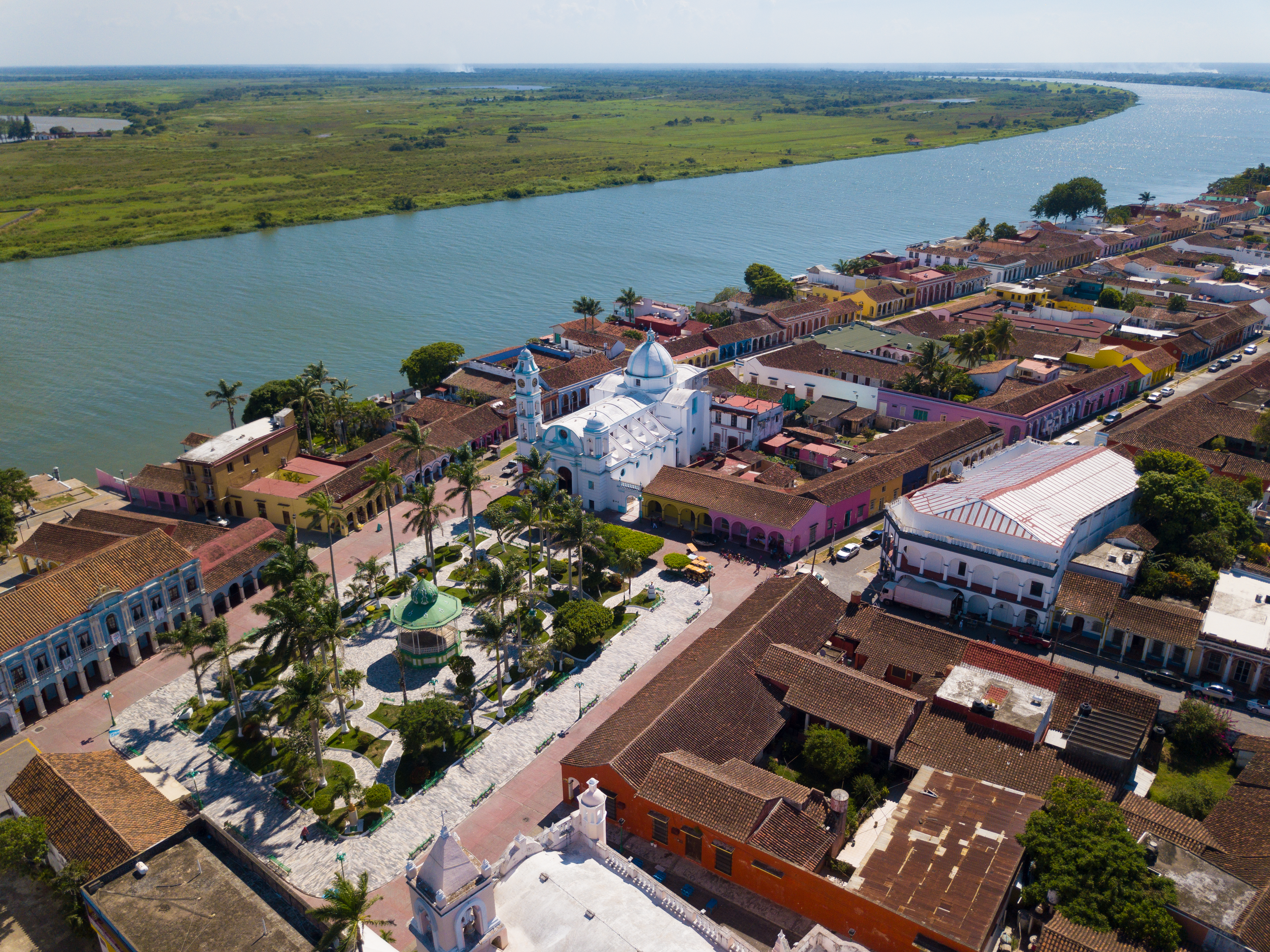
Colonial layout of Tlacotalpan, Mexico

The traza or layout was the pattern on which Spanish American cities were built beginning in the colonial era. At the heart of Spanish colonial cities was a central plaza, with the main church, town council (cabildo) building, residences of the main civil and religious officials, and the residences of the most important residents (vecinos) of the town built there. The principal businesses were also located around this central plan. Radiated from the main square were streets in at right angles, a grid that could extend as the settlement grew, impeded only by geography. About three decades into colonization of the New World, the conquistadores started to build and plan cities according to laws prescribed by the monarchs in the Laws of the Indies. In addition to describing other aspects of the interactions between the Spanish conquerors and the natives they encountered, these laws ordained the specific ways new settlements should be laid out. In addition to specifying the layout, the laws also required a pattern in settlement based on social standing, in which the people of higher social status lived closer to the center of the town, the center of political, ecclesiastical, and economic power. The 1790 census for Mexico City indicates that in the traza that there was indeed a higher concentration of Spaniards (españoles), but that there was no absolute racial or class segregation in the city, particularly since elite households usually had non-white servants.

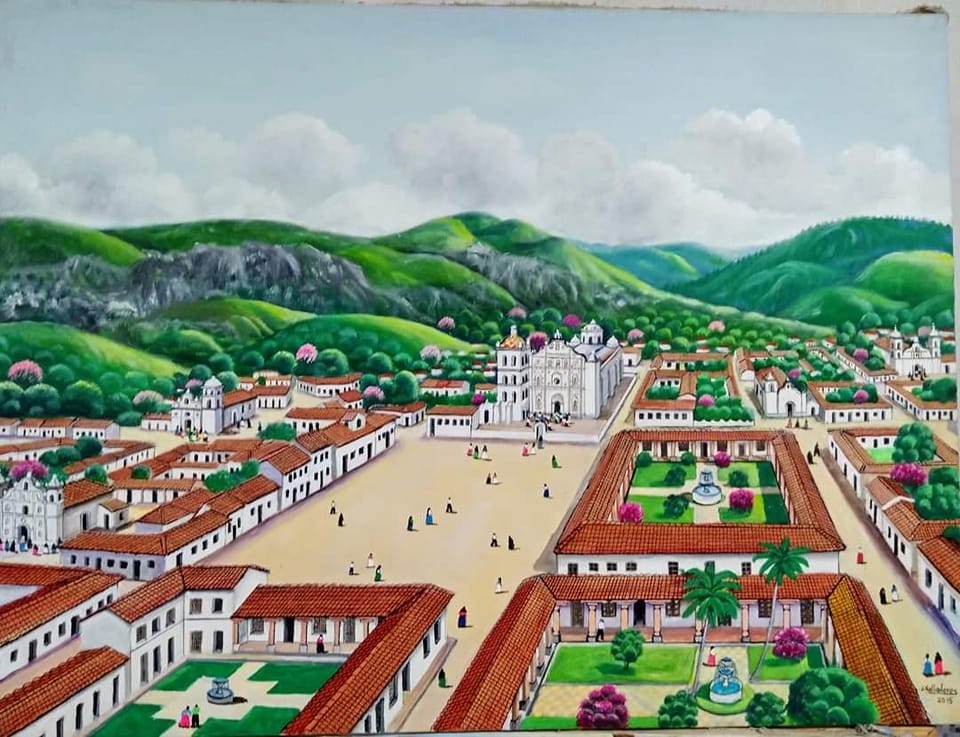
A painting that historically recreates the city of Comayagua at the beginning of the 18th century with its grid-style layout, which is still intact in the historic center of the city and its surroundings.

The grid was not limited to Spanish settlements; however, "Reducciones" Indian Reductions and "Congregaciones" were created in a similar grid-like manner for Indians in order to organize these populations in more manageable units for purposes of taxation, military efficiency and in order to teach Indians the way of the Spanish.

Modern cities in Latin America have grown, and consequently erased or jumbled the previous standard spatial and social organization of the cityscape. Elites do not always live closer to the city center, and the point-space occupied by individuals is not necessarily determined by their social status. The central plaza, the wide streets and a grid pattern are still common elements in Mexico City and Puebla de Los Angeles. It is not uncommon in modern-founded towns, especially those in remote areas of Latin America, to have retained the "checkerboard layout" even to present day.

Mexico City is a good example of how these ordinances were followed in laying out a city. Previously the capital of the Aztec empire, Tenochtitlan was captured and placed under Spanish rule in 1521. After news of the conquest, the king sent instructions very similar to the aforementioned Ordinance of 1513. In some parts the instructions are almost verbatim to his previous ones. The instructions were meant to direct the conqueror—Hernán Cortés—on how to lay out the city and how to allocate land to the Spaniards. It is pointed out, however, that though the king might have sent many such orders and instructions to other conquistadores, Cortés was perhaps the first one to implement them. He insisted on carrying out the building of a new city where the Indian Empire had stood, and he incorporated features of the old plaza into the new grid. Much was accomplished since he was accompanied by men familiar with the grid system and the royal instructions. The point here is that Cortés accomplished the planning and was on his way to finish the building of Mexico City before the royal ordinances addressed specifically to him even arrived. Men like Cortés and Alonso García Bravo (who is also called "the good geometer"), played a crucial role in creating a city scape of New World cities as we know them.

== Church and mission architecture ==
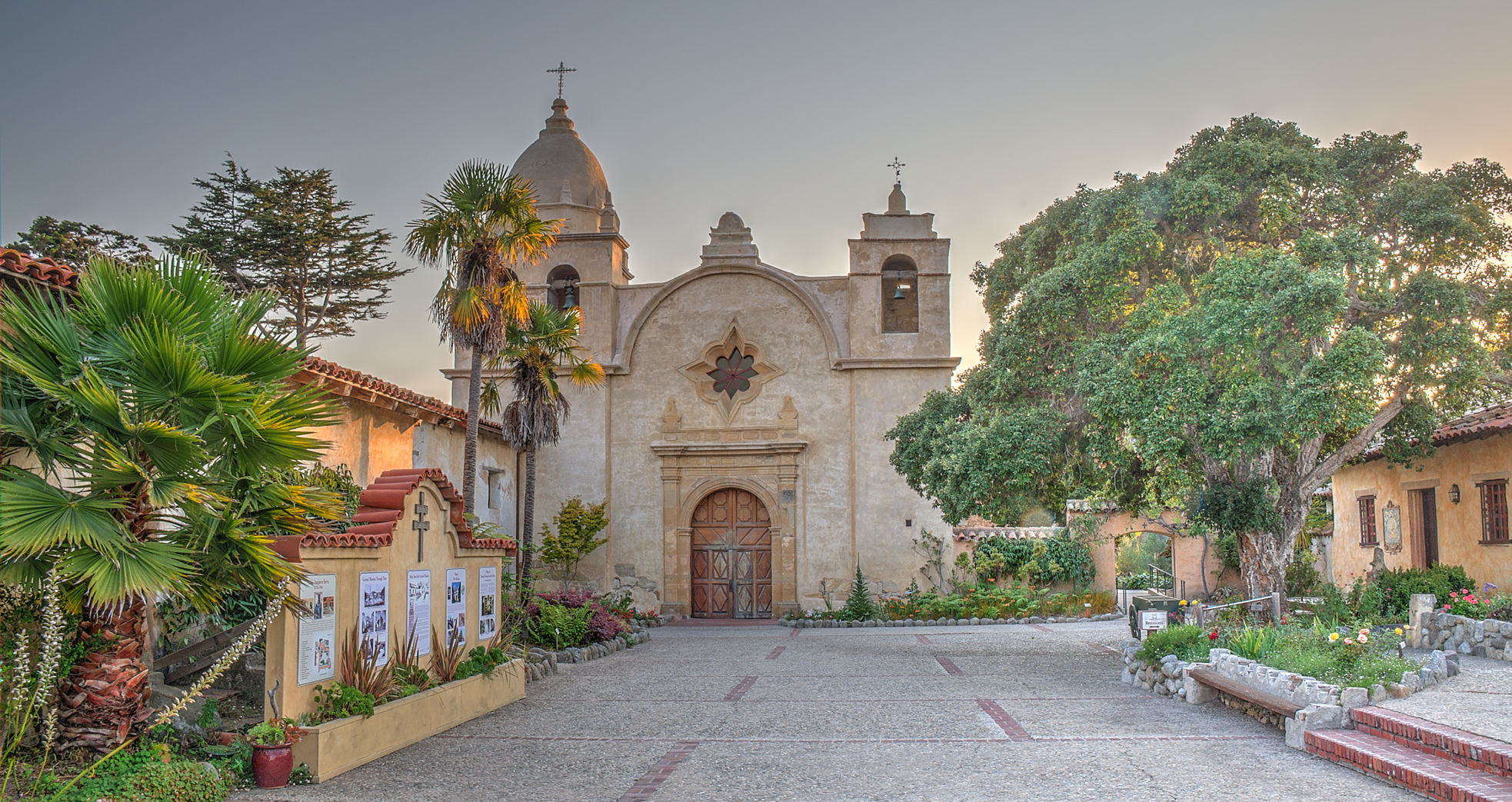
Mission San Carlos Borromeo de Carmelo, California, United States

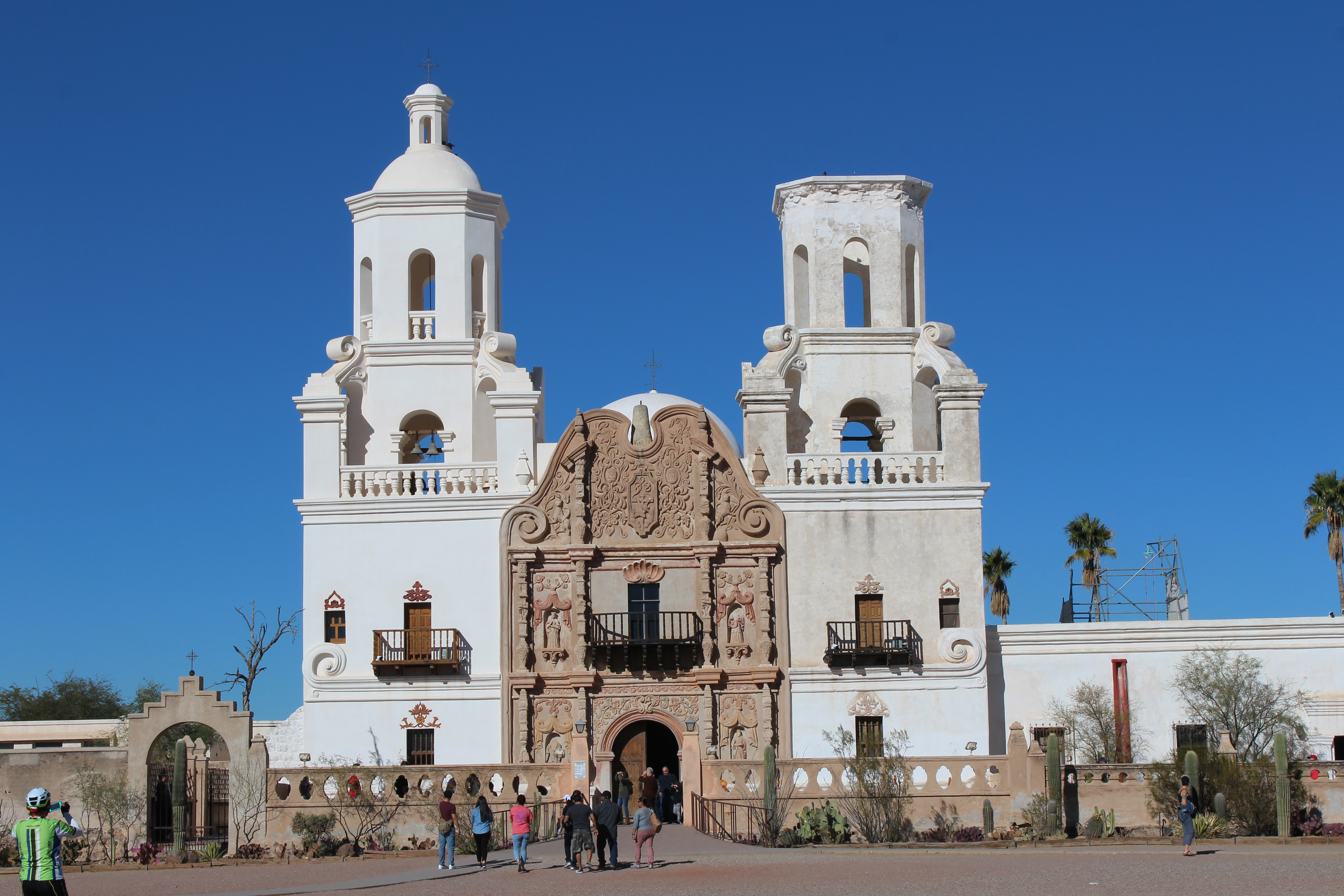
Mission San Xavier del Bac, Arizona, United States

In places of dense indigenous settlement, such as in Central Mexico, the mendicant orders (Franciscans, Dominicans, and Augustinians) built churches on the sites of pre-Hispanic temples. In the early period of the "spiritual conquest", there were so many indigenous neophytes who attended Mass that a large open-air atrium was built, walling off a space within the church complex to create an enlarged sacred space without great expense of building. Indigenous labor was used in construction; since a communities sacred place was a symbol and embodiment of that community, laboring to create these structures was not necessarily an unwanted burden. Since Mexico experienced many sixteenth-century epidemics that drastically diminished the size of the central Mexican indigenous population, there were often elaborate churches with few Indians still living to attend them, such as the Augustinian church at Acolman, Mexico. The different mendicant orders had distinct styles of building. Franciscans built large churches to accommodate the new neophytes, Dominican churches were highly ornamented, while the Augustinian churches were characterized by their critics as opulent and sumptuous.

Mission churches were often of simple design. As mendicants were pushed out of central Mexico and as Jesuits also evangelized Indians in northern Mexico, they built mission churches as part of a larger complex, with living quarters and workshops for resident Indians. Unlike central Mexico, where churches were built in existing indigenous towns, on the frontier where indigenous did not live in such settlements, the mission complex was created. In Central America, churches were built once a city was founded where an indigenous town already existed, as in the case of the city of Comayagua in Honduras, which is located in a valley that was densely populated by natives, similar to the case of the Valley of Mexico. The first churches to be built by the Franciscans to evangelize the populations were the Church of San Francisco and the Iglesia de la Merced, and later the cathedral. In the rest of America a similar pattern was followed by the authorities.

== Spanish East Indies ==
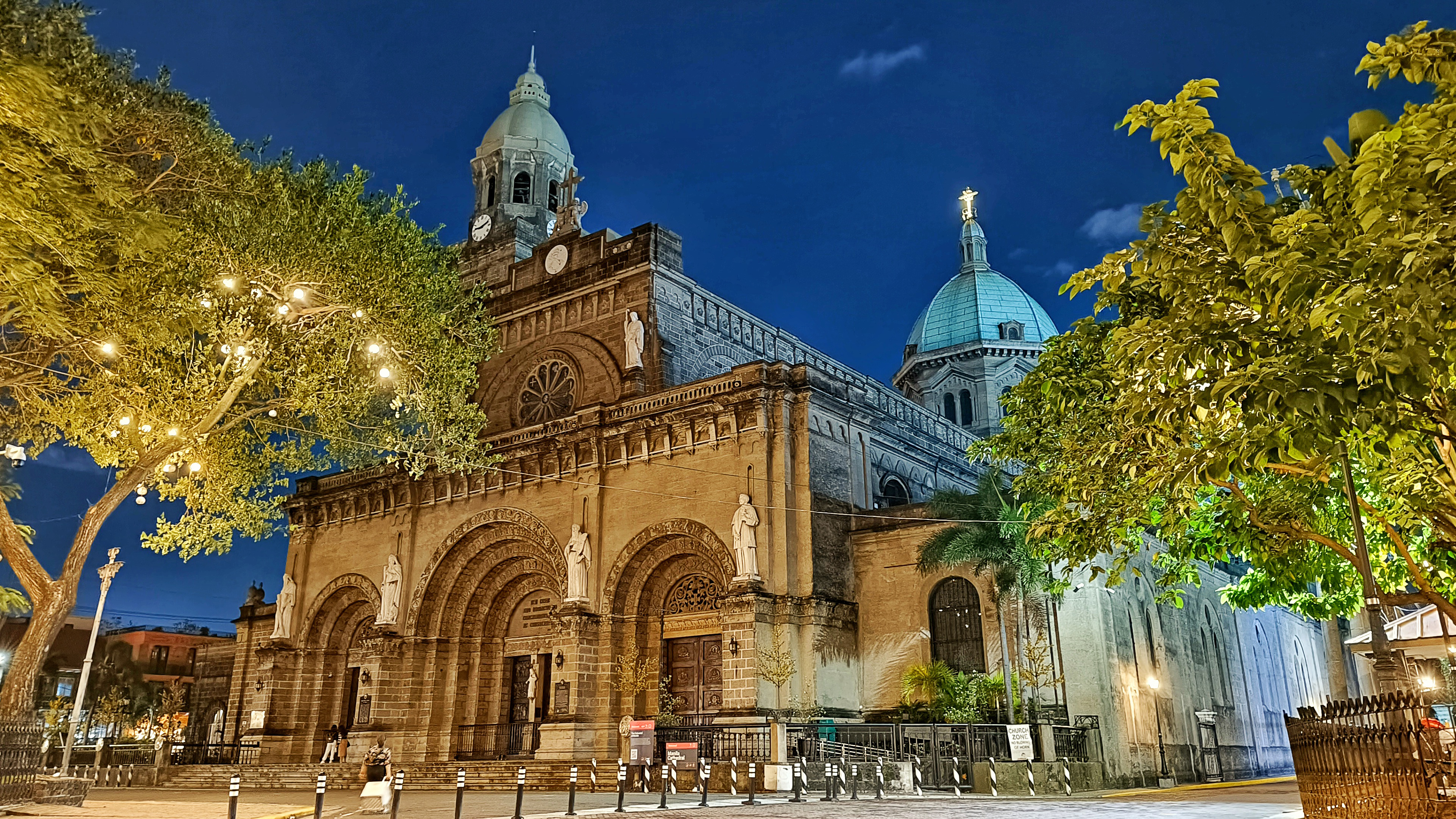
The Manila Cathedral of the Philippines

The arrival of the Spaniards in 1571 brought in European colonial architecture to the Philippines. Specifically suited for the hot tropics of the new Far East territory, European architecture was transposed via Acapulco, Mexico into a uniquely Filipino style. The nipa hut or bahay kubo of the Indigenous Filipinos gave way to the bahay na bato (stone house) and other Filipino houses collectively called Bahay Filipino (Filipino houses) and became the typical houses of Filipinos in the past. Bahay na bato were also referred to as arquitectura mestiza ("mixed architecture") by the Jesuit priest Ignacio Alzina in 1668 due to it being composed of both wood and stone.

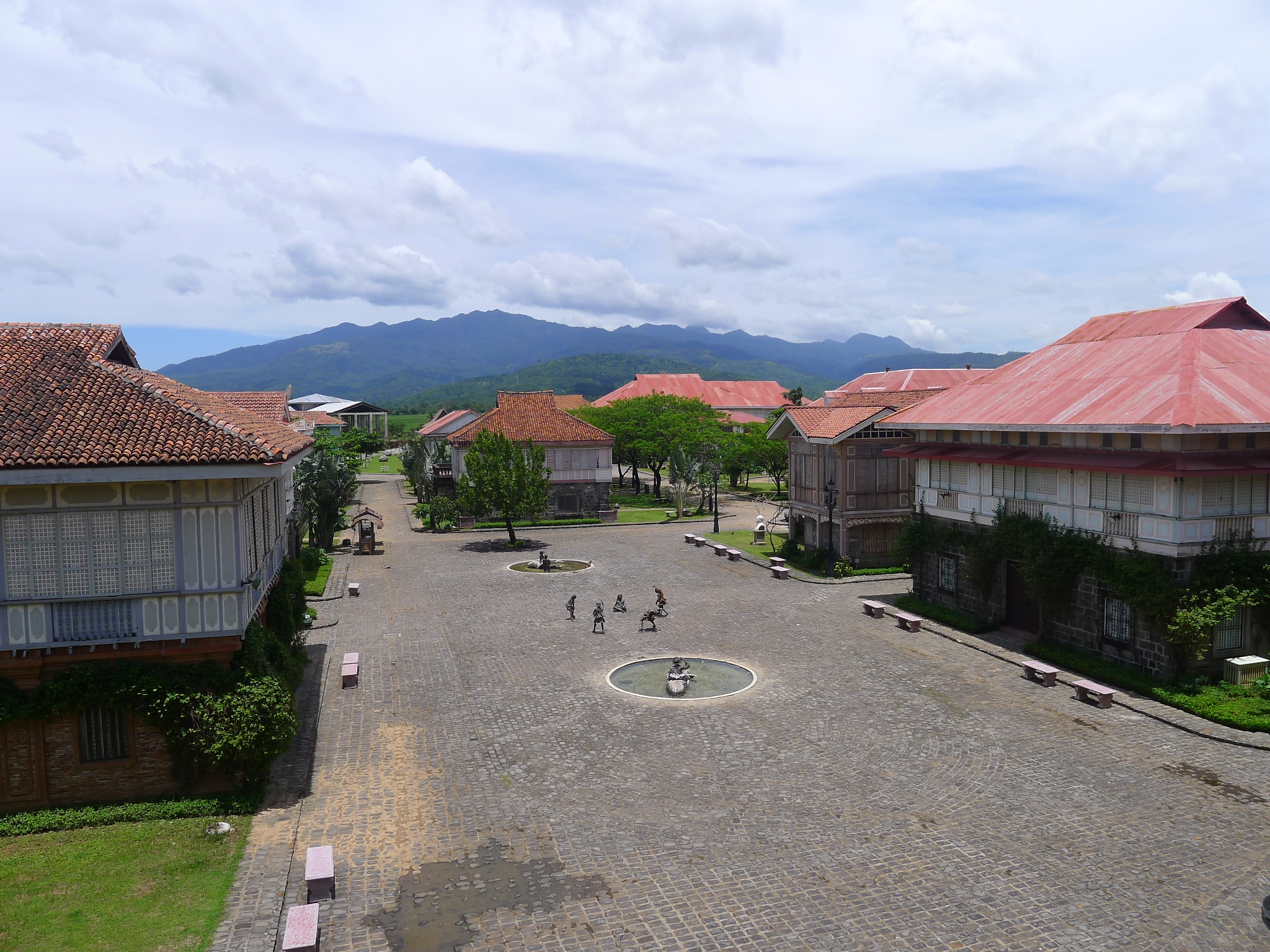
Typical examples of restored and relocated bahay na bato architecture in the Las Casas Filipinas de Acuzar. The style combines elements of Spanish architecture with the raised bahay kubo designs of native Filipinos

The Bahay Filipino houses followed the nipa hut's arrangements, such as open ventilation and elevated apartments. The most obvious difference between Filipino houses would be the materials that were used to build them. The bahay na bato is a hybrid of native Austronesian and Spanish architecture. Its most common appearance is like that of a stilt nipa hut standing on Spanish-style stone blocks or bricks as a foundation instead of just wood or bamboo stilts. It would usually have solid stone foundations or brick lower walls, and overhanging, wooden upper story/stories with balustrades, ventanillas and capiz-shell sliding sashes on windows. The roof was either a Spanish-style curving clay tile roof (teja de curva) or a thatched nipa roof. The latter was largely replaced by galvanized iron roofs in the late 19th century. Today these houses are more commonly called ancestral houses, due to most ancestral houses in the Philippines being bahay na bato.

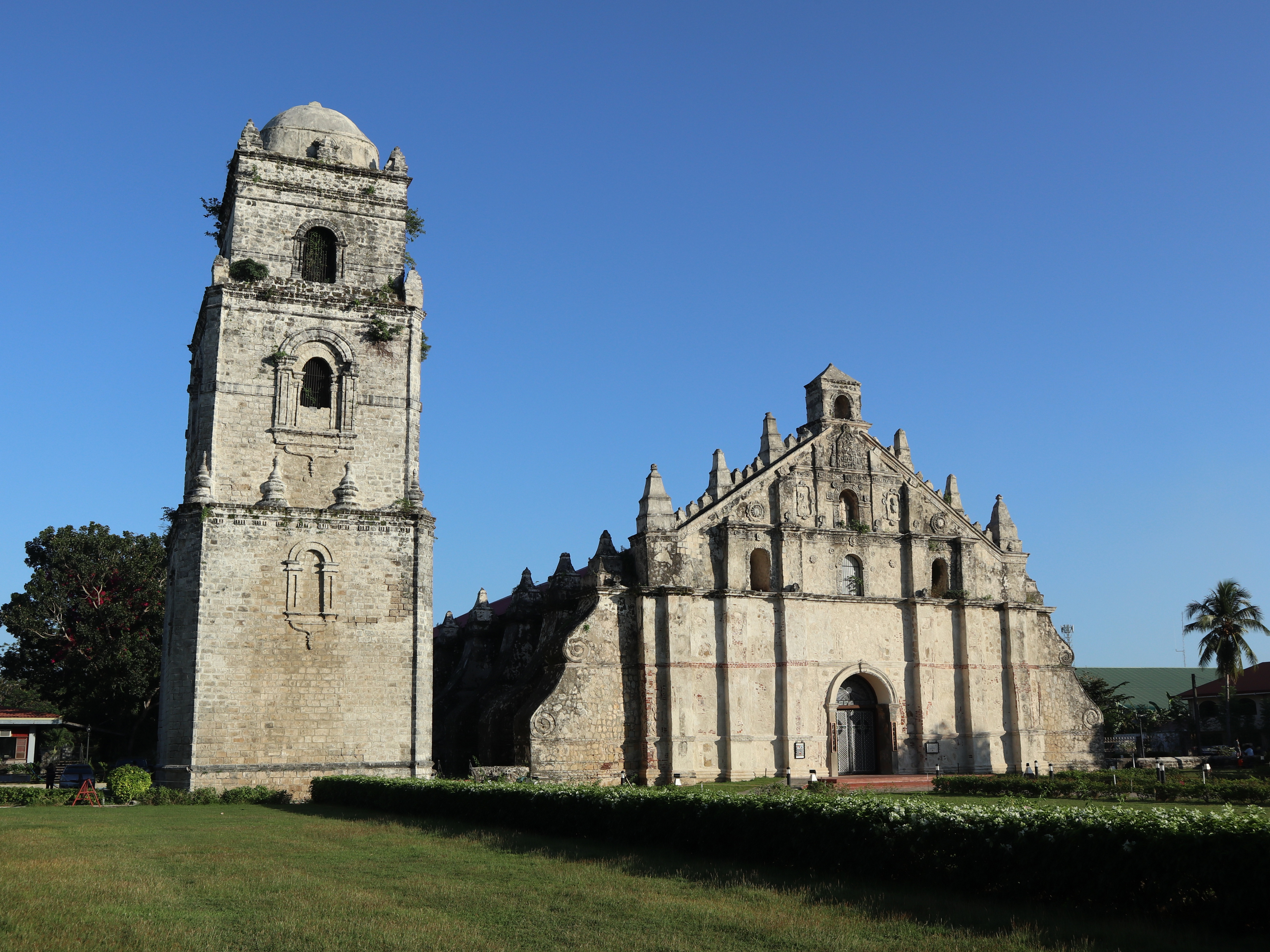
Paoay Church in Ilocos Norte, Philippines, an example of Earthquake Baroque architecture

Earthquake Baroque is a style of Baroque architecture found in the Philippines, which suffered destructive earthquakes during the 17th century and 18th century, where large public buildings, such as churches, were rebuilt in a Baroque style. In the Philippines, destruction of earlier churches from frequent earthquakes have made the church proportion lower and wider; side walls were made thicker and heavily buttressed for stability during shaking. The upper structures were made with lighter materials.

Bell towers are usually lower and stouter compared to towers in less seismically active regions of the world. Towers have thicker girth in the lower levels, progressively narrowing to the topmost level. In some churches of the Philippines, aside from functioning as watchtowers against pirates, some bell towers are detached from the main church building to avoid damage in case of a falling bell tower due to an earthquake.

== Gallery ==
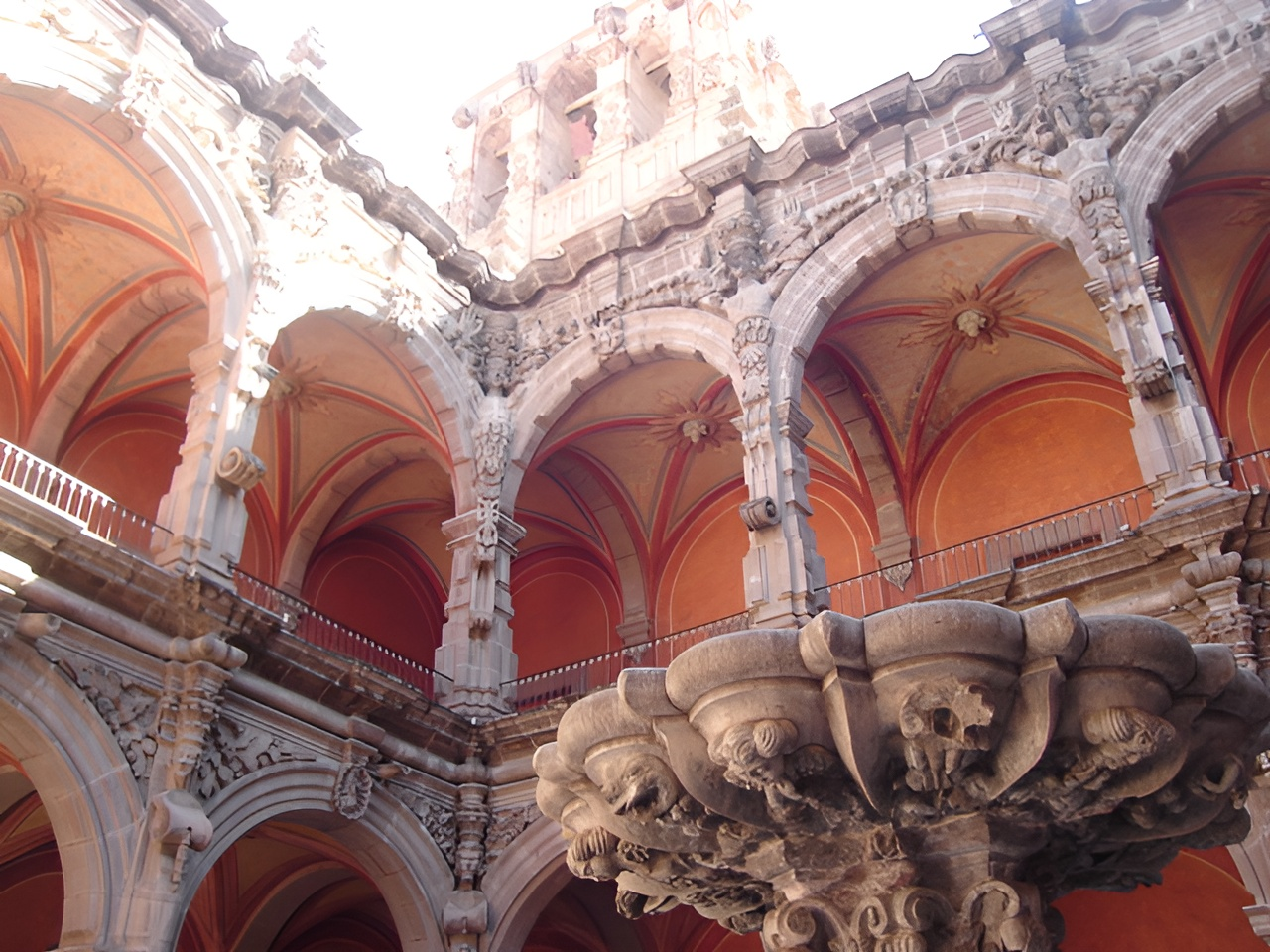
Monasterio de San Agustín, Santiago de Querétaro, Mexico

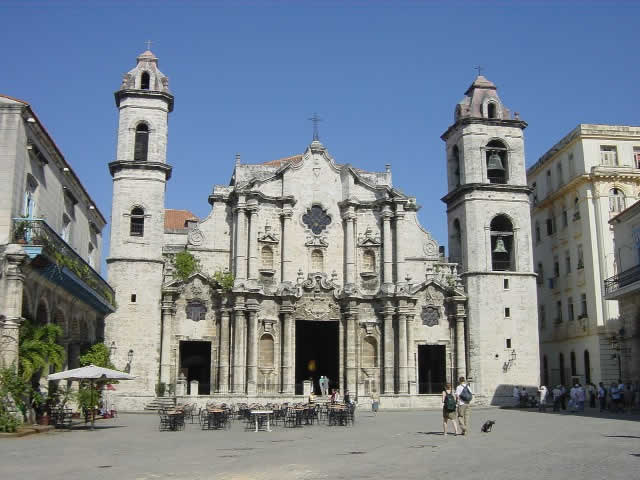
Havana Cathedral, Cuba

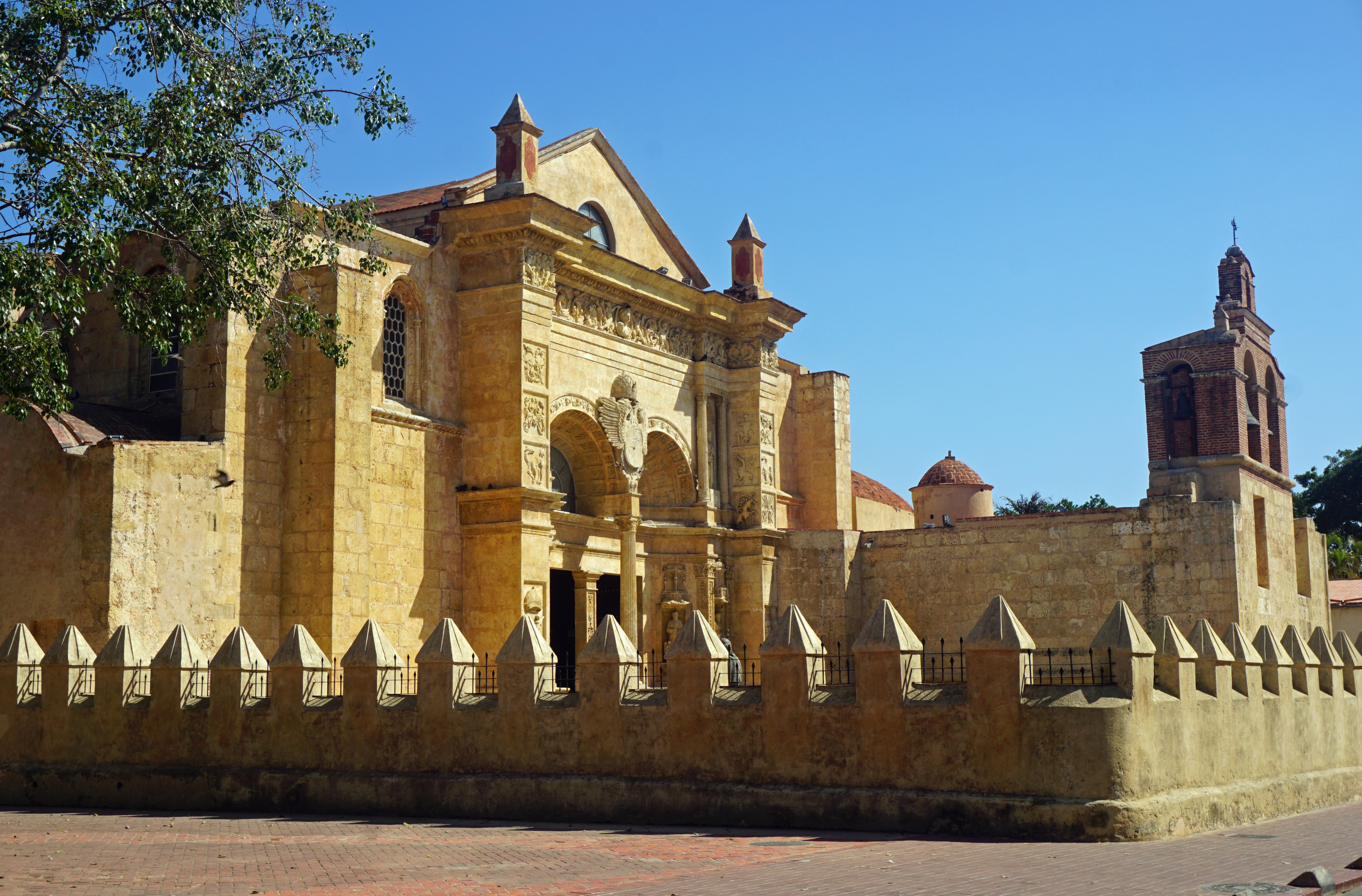
Basilica Cathedral of Santo Domingo, Dominican Republic

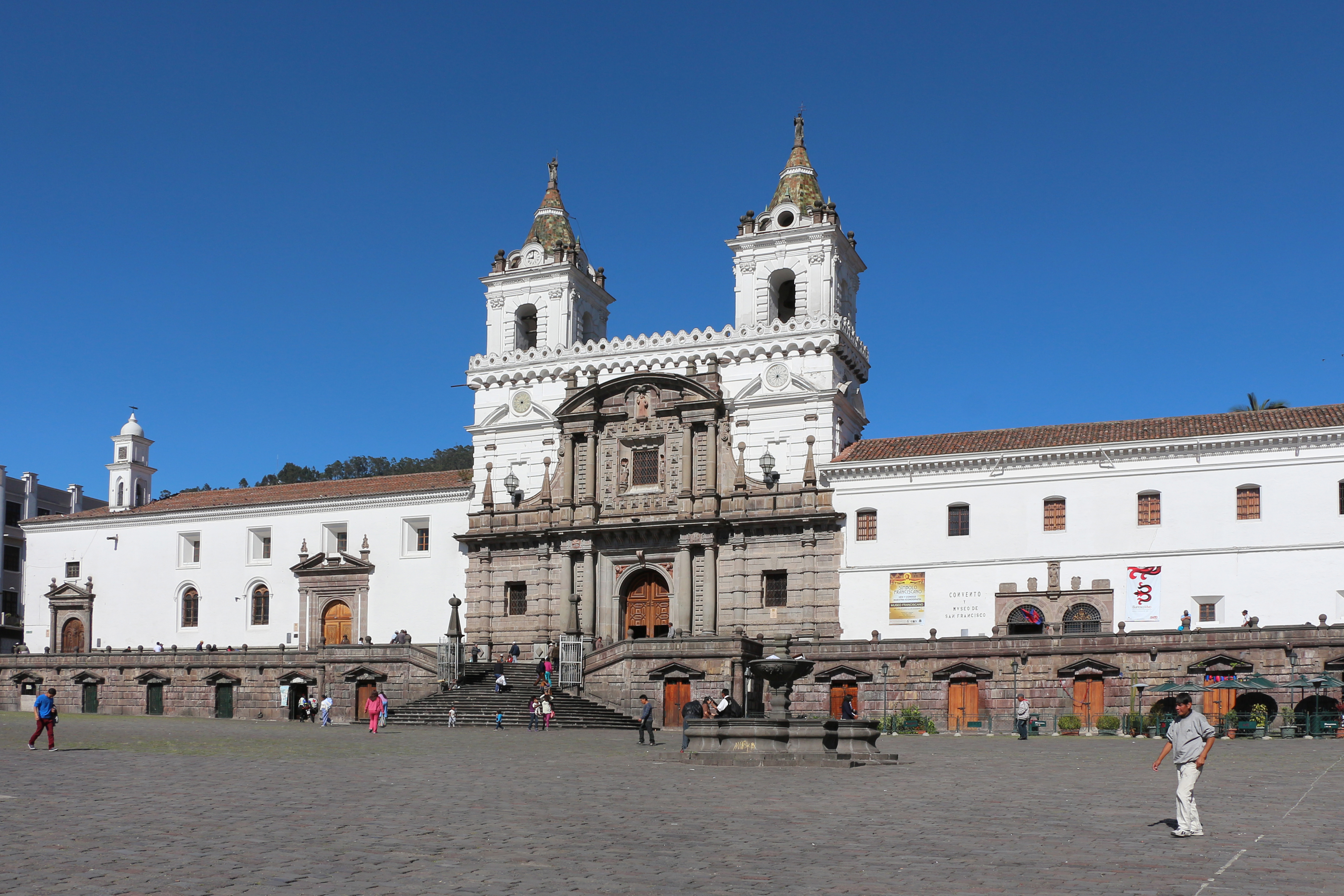
Iglesia y Convento de San Francisco, Quito, Ecuador

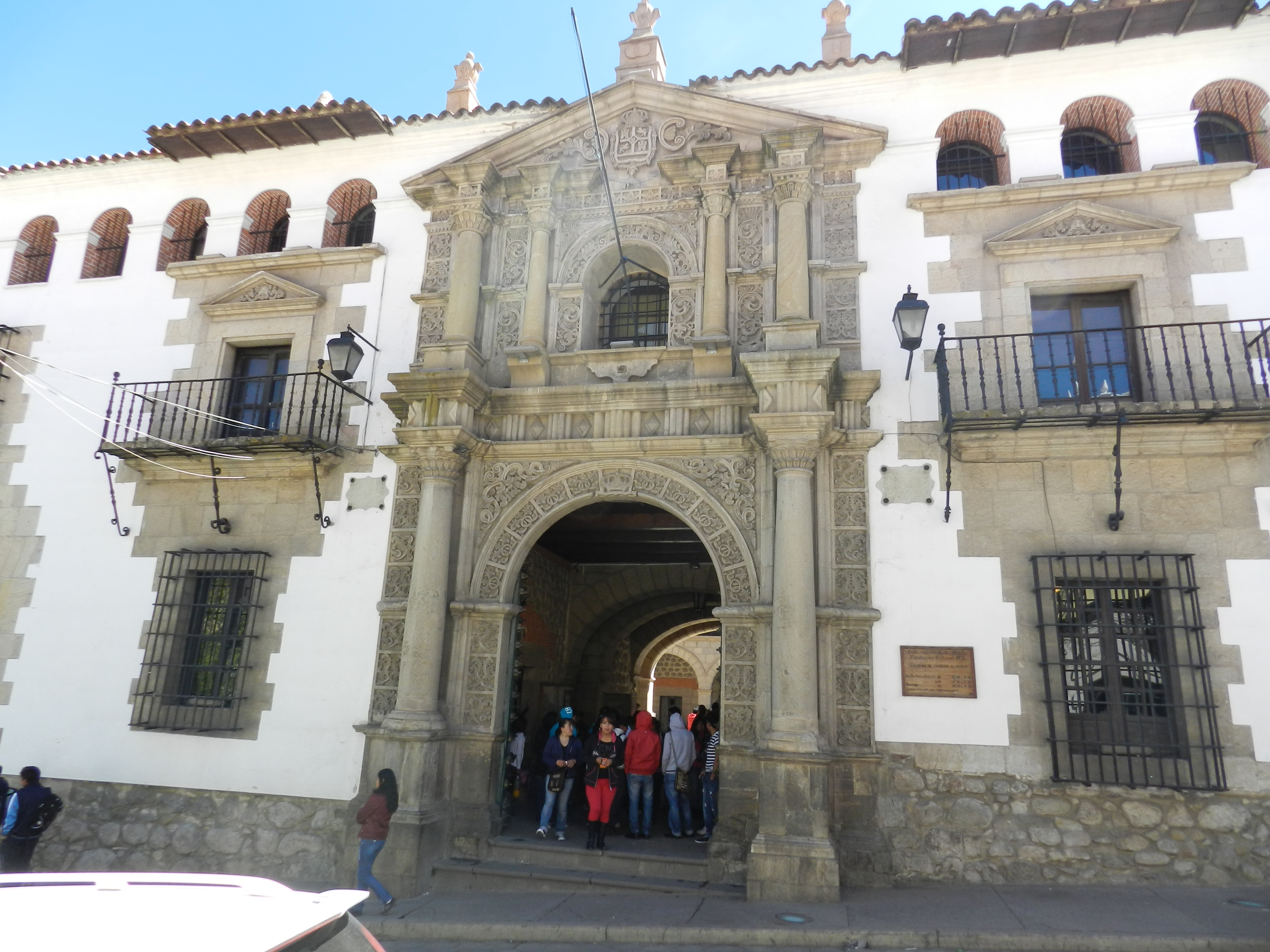
Mint of Potosí, Bolivia

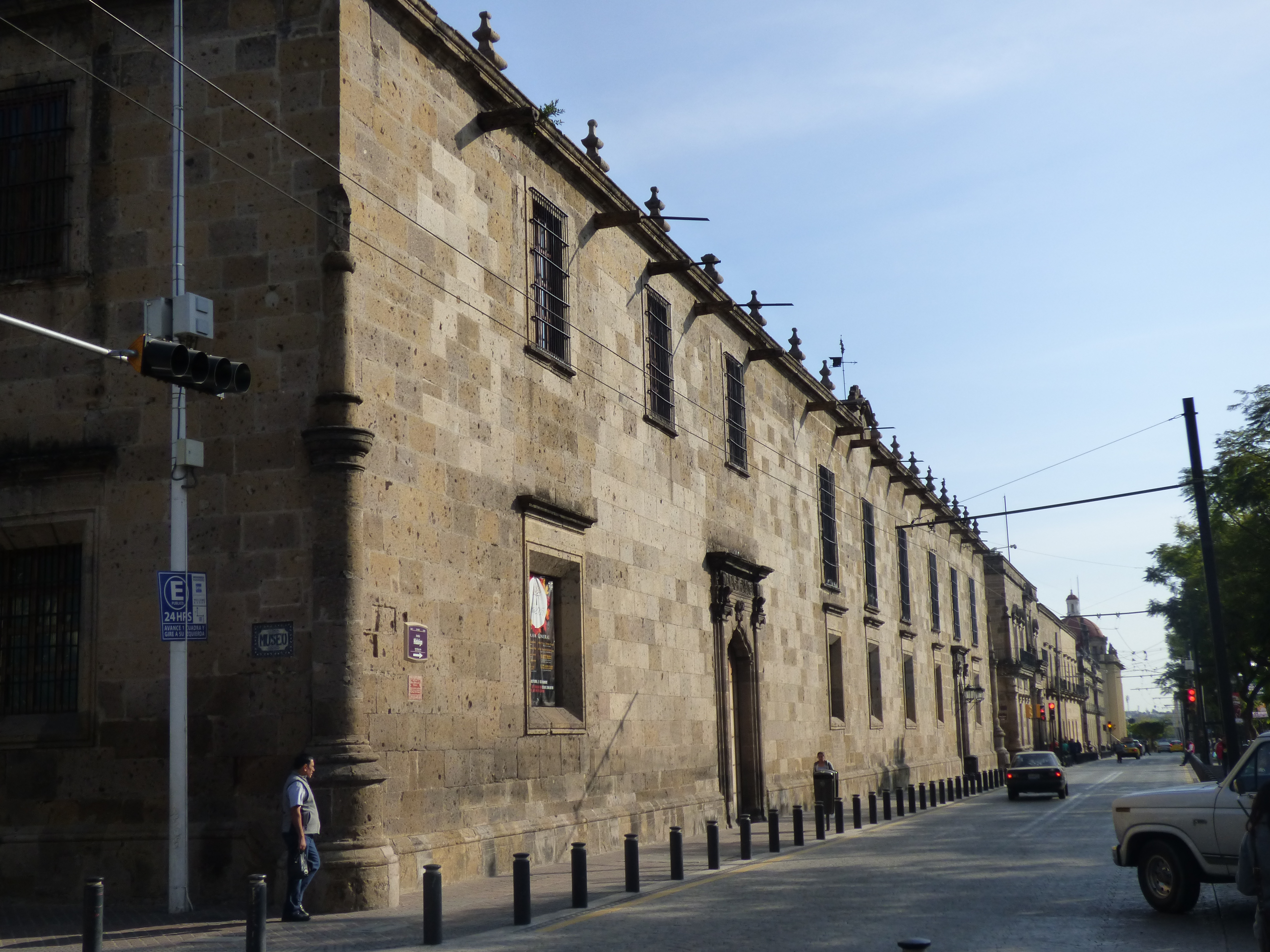
Regional Museum of Guadalajara, Guadalajara, Mexico

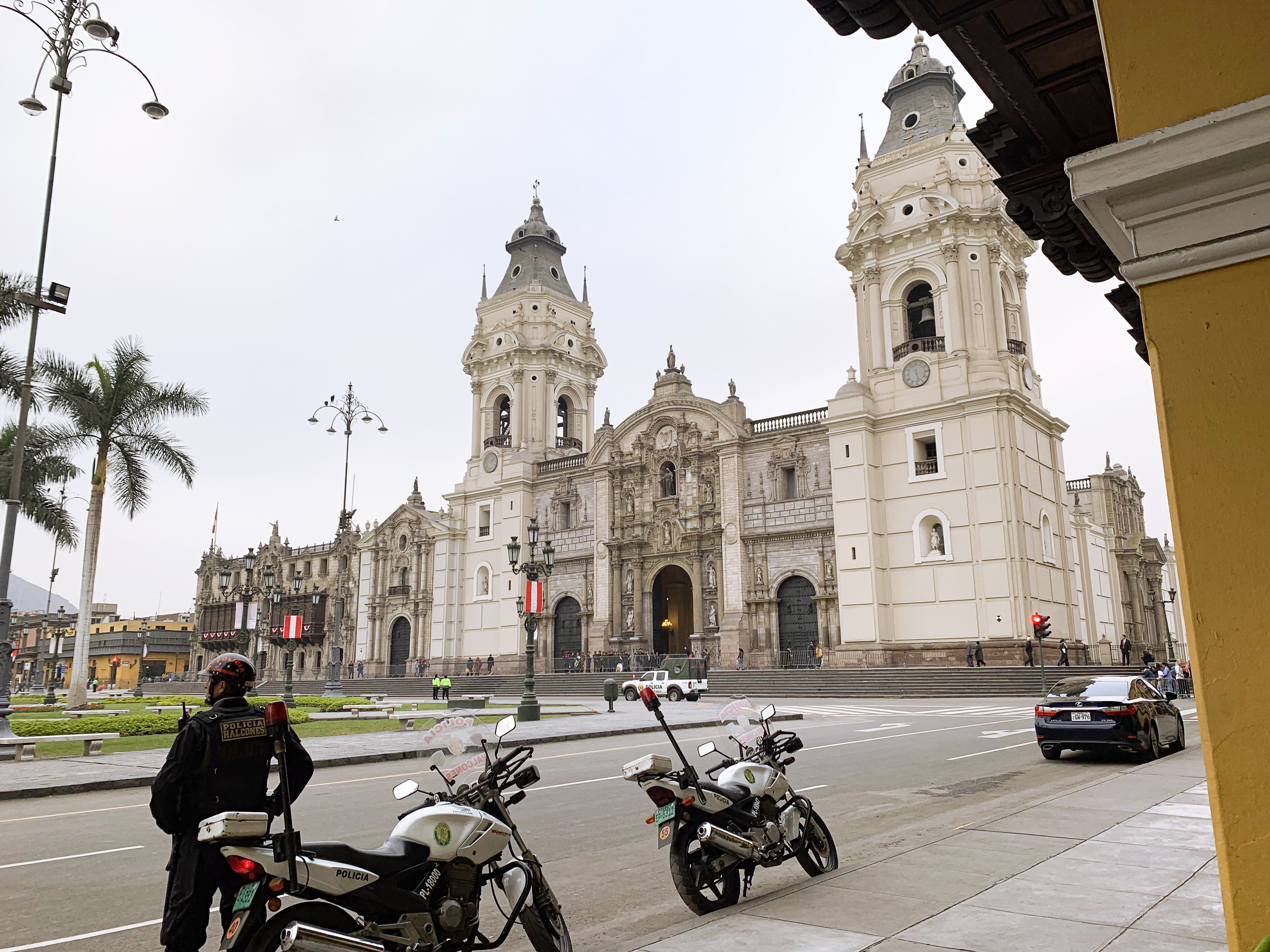
Cathedral Basilica of Lima, Peru

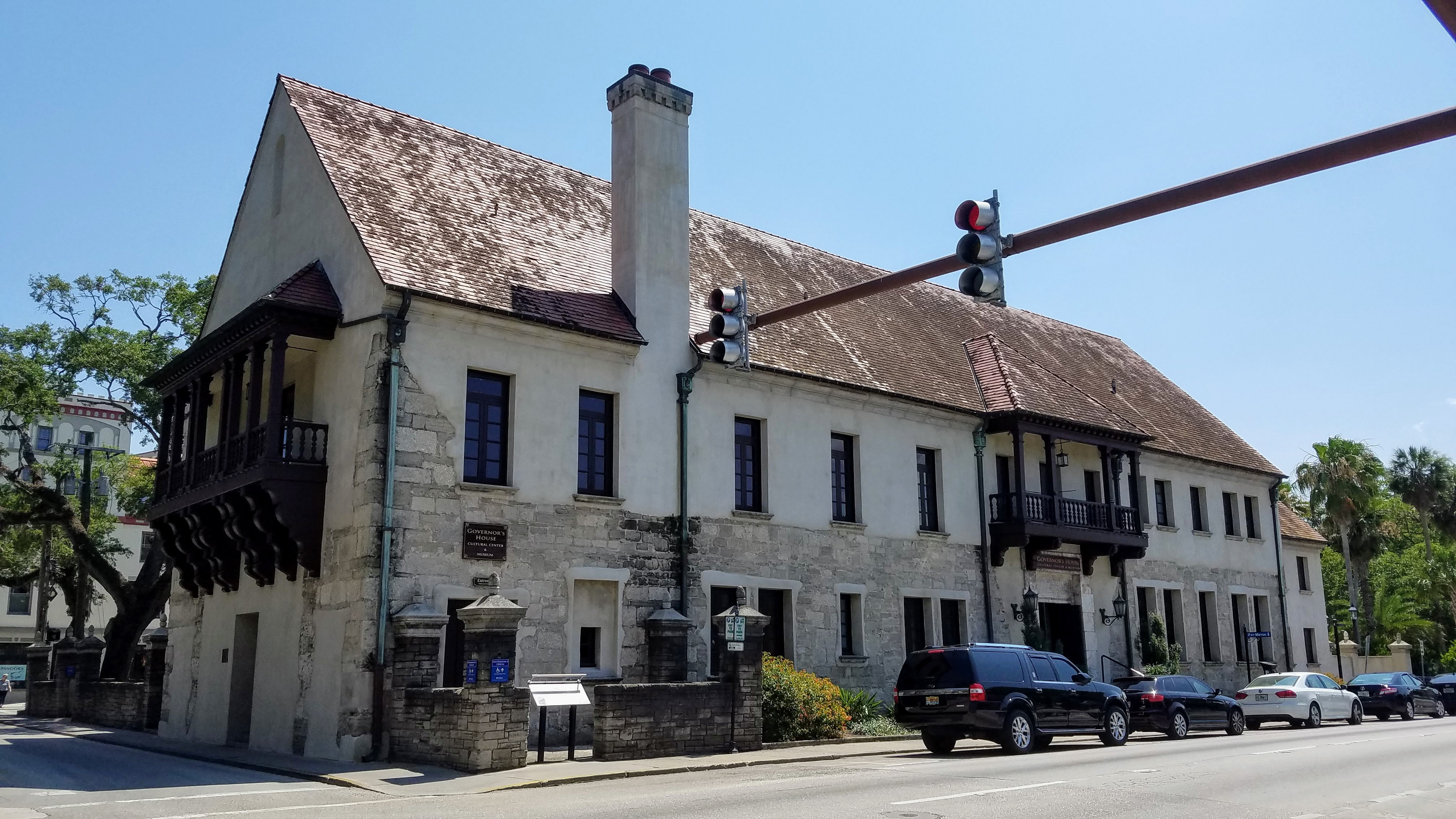
Government House, St. Augustine, United States

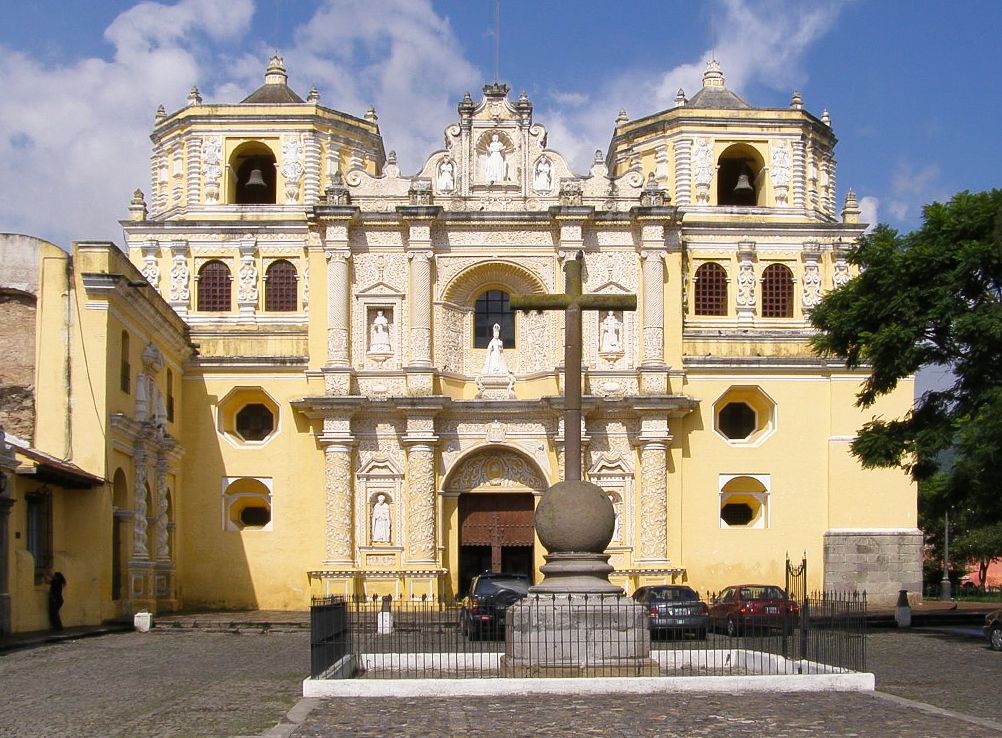
Iglesia de La Merced, Antigua Guatemala

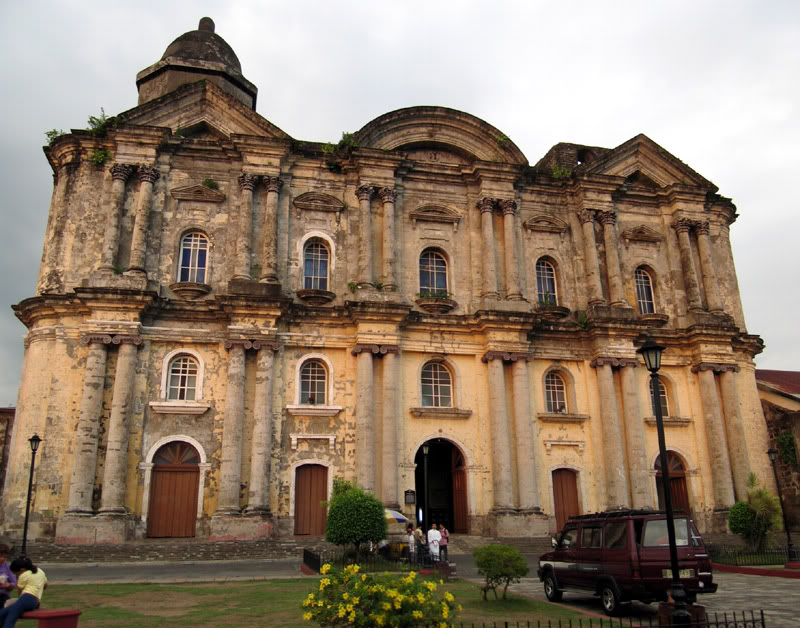
Taal Basilica, Philippines

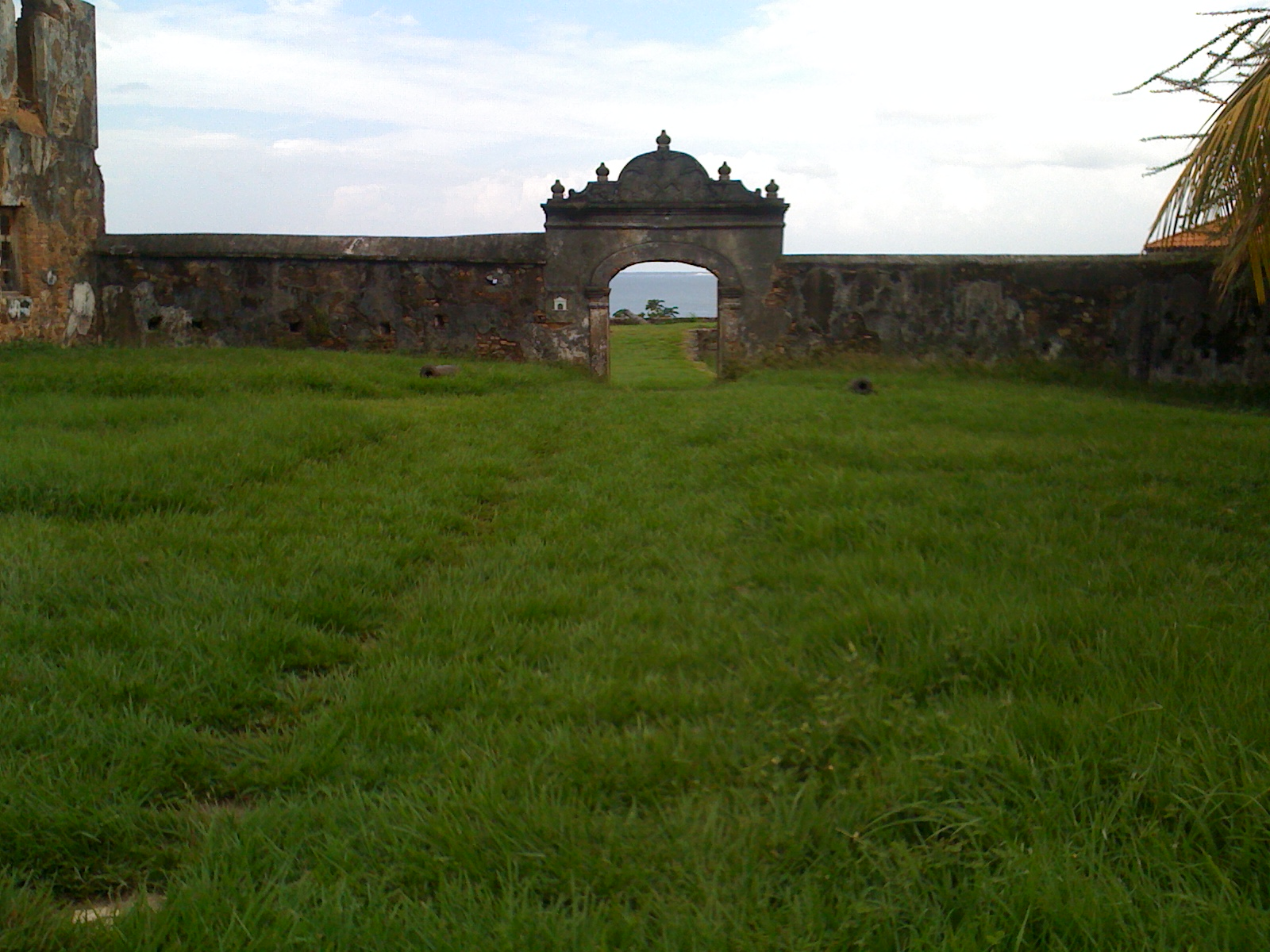
Santa Barbara Fortress, Trujillo, Honduras

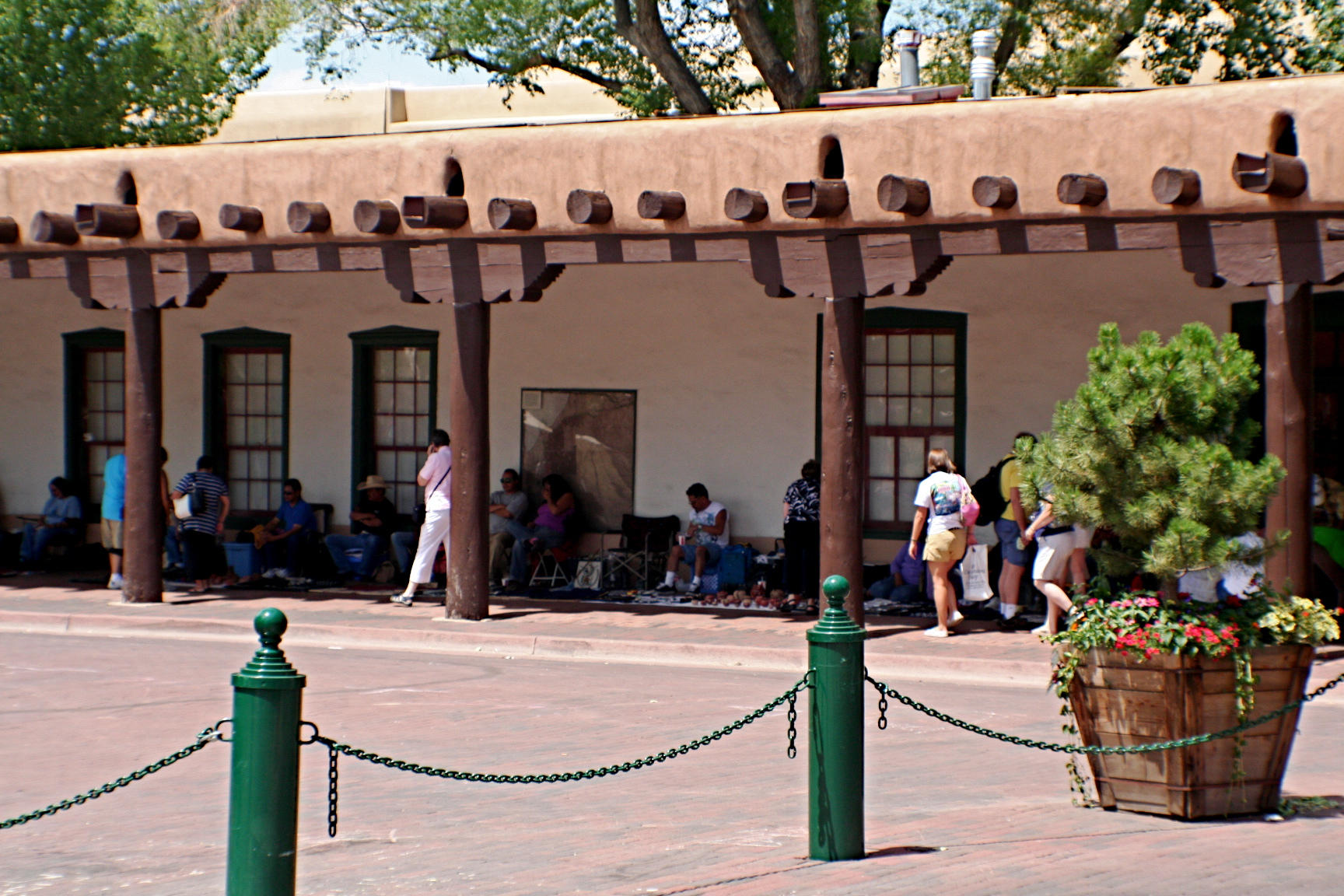
Palace of the Governors, Santa Fe, United States

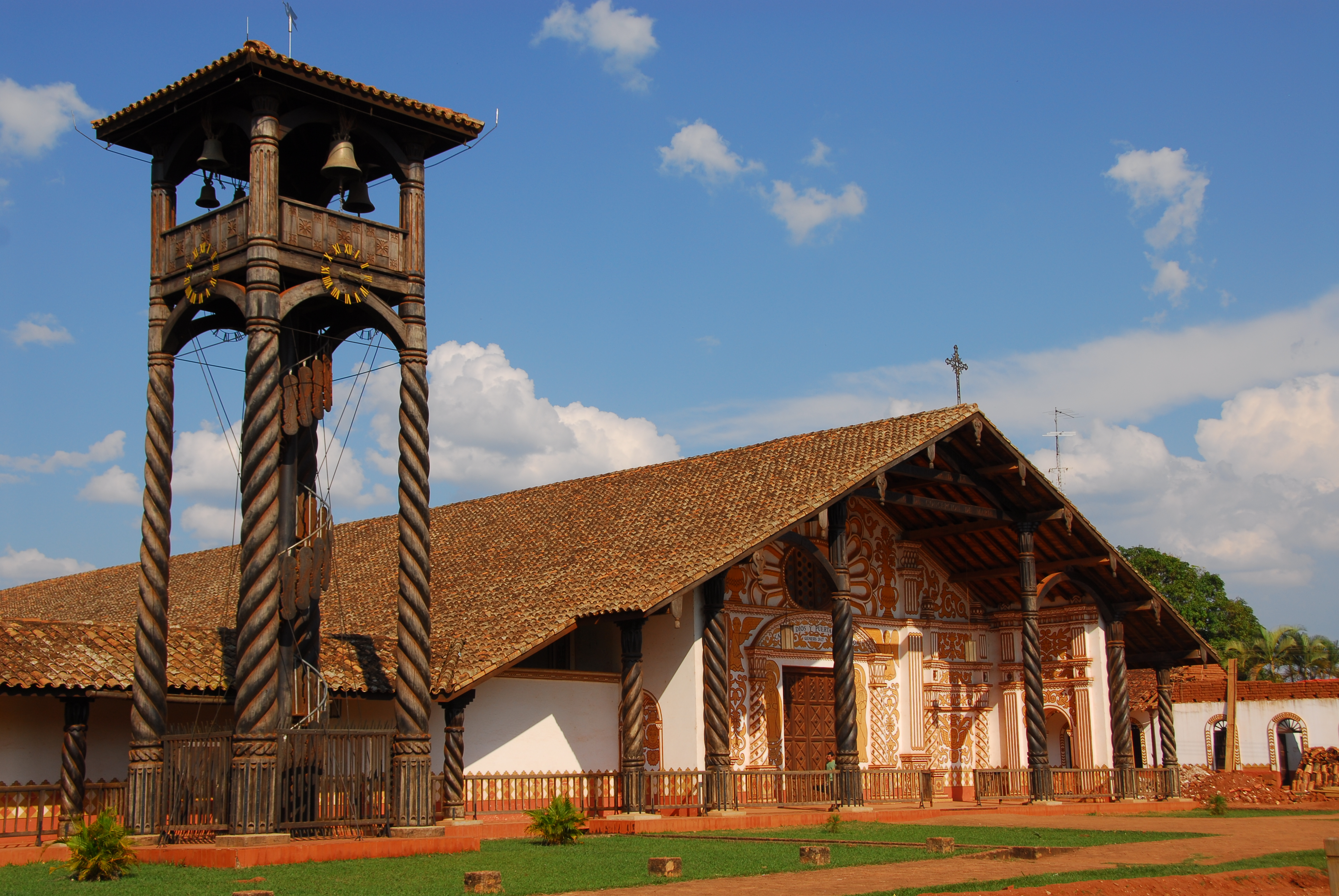
Church of the Missions, Concepción, Santa Cruz Department, Bolivia

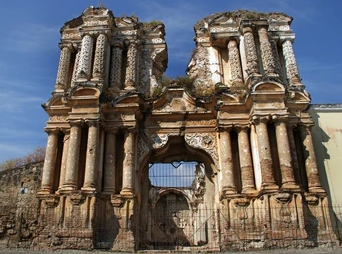
Iglesias del Carmen, Antigua Guatemala

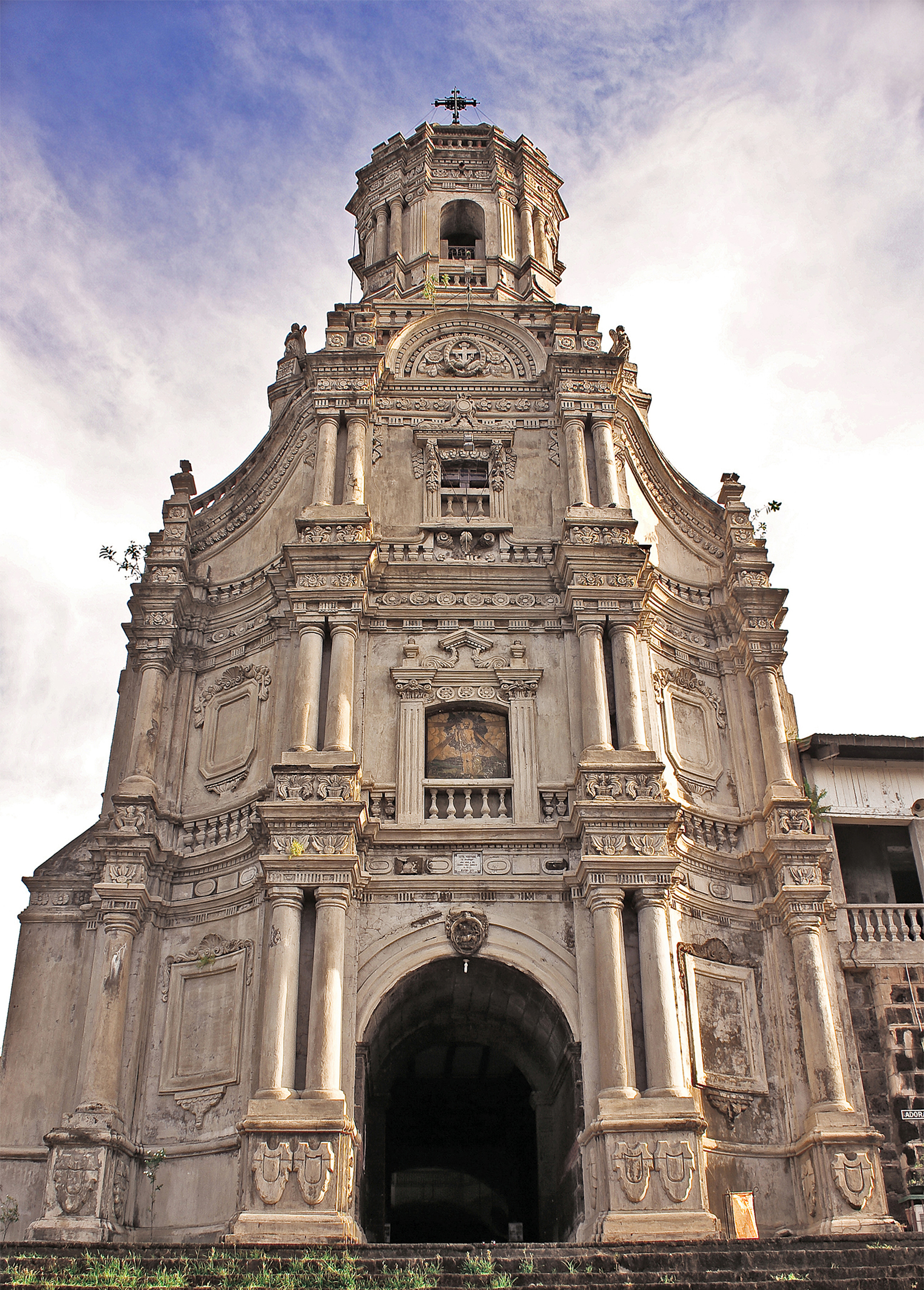
Morong Church, Rizal, Philippines

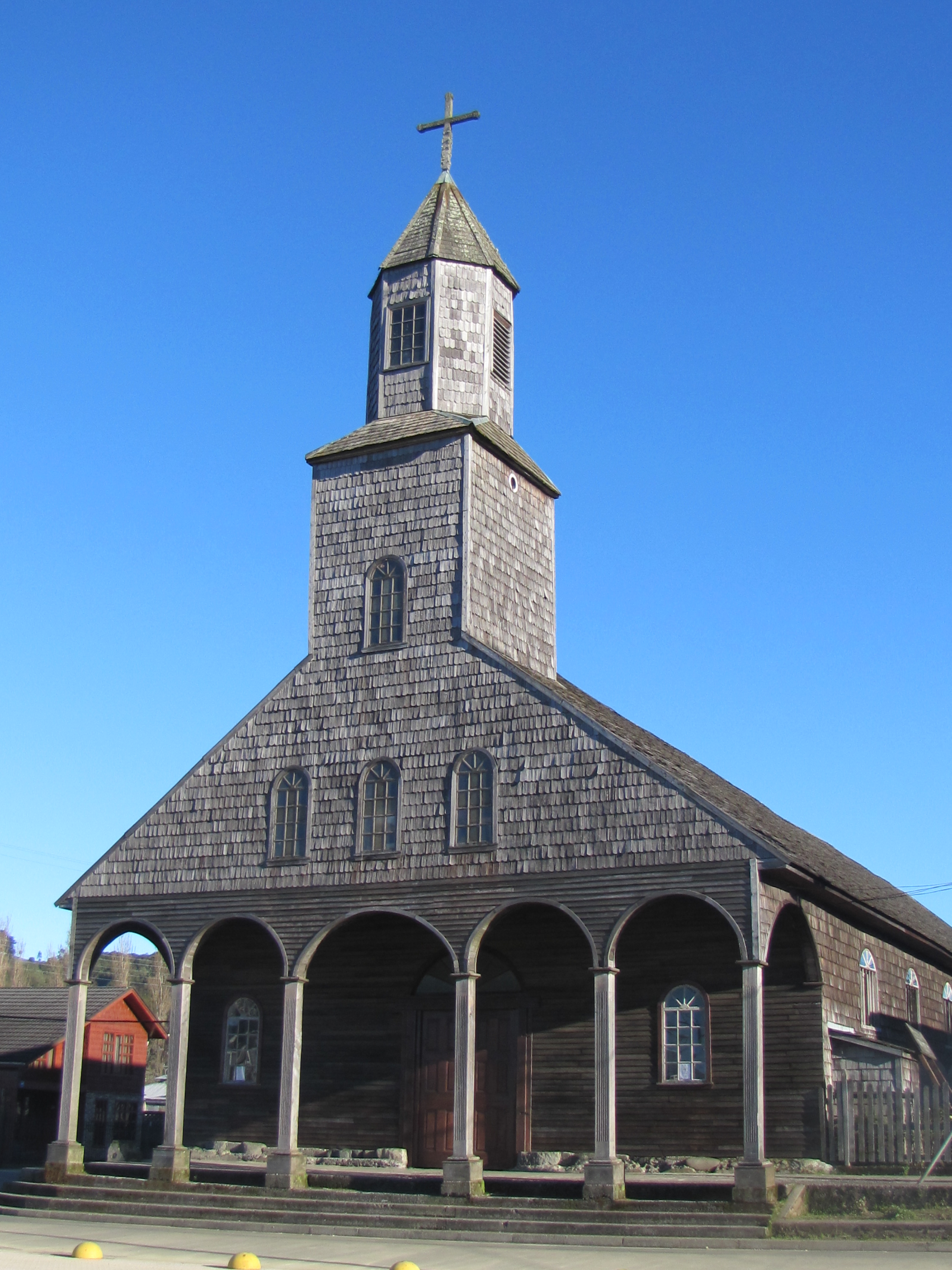
Church of Santa María de Loreto, Achao, Churches of Chiloé, Colonial Chilotan architecture, Chile

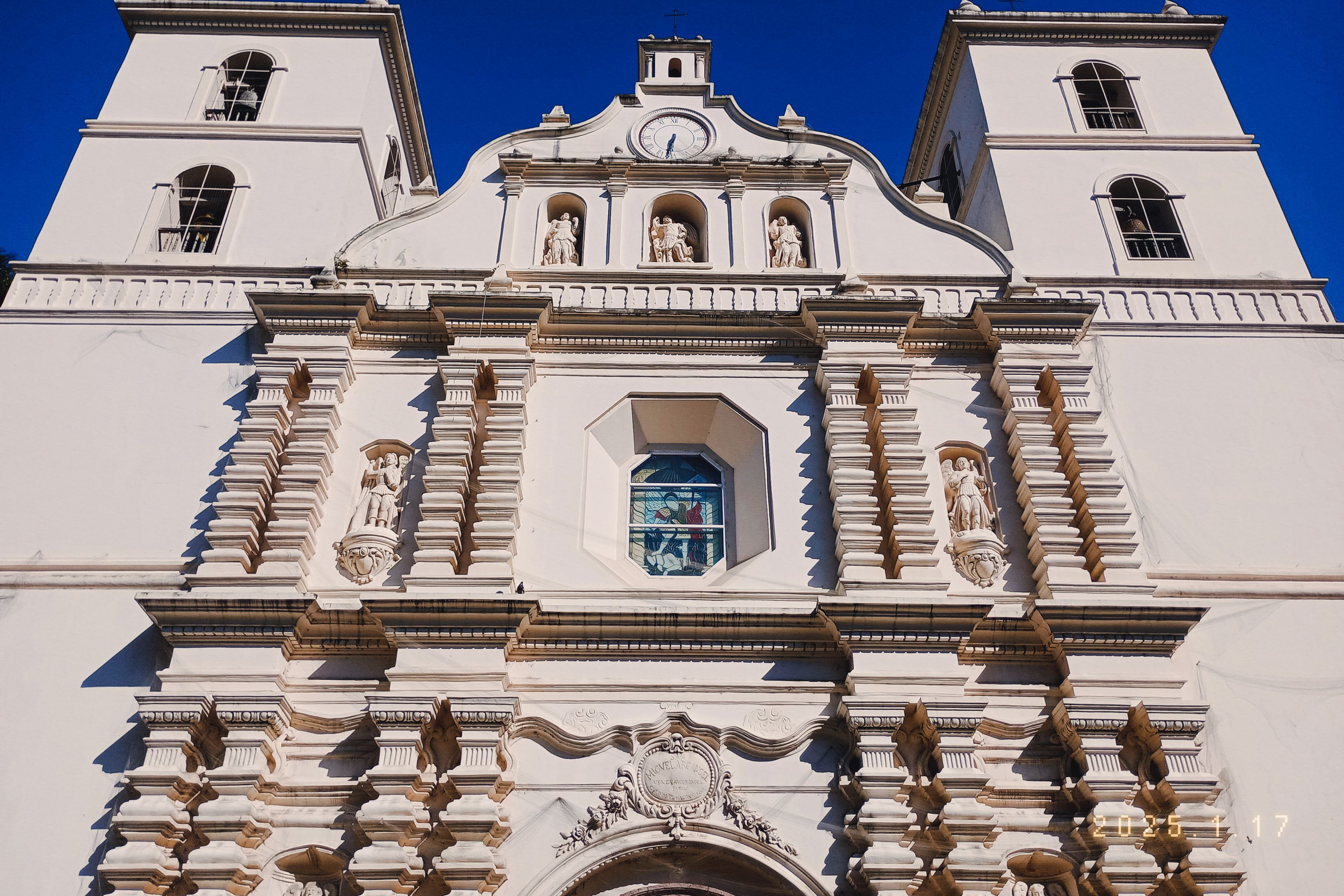
Metropolitan Cathedral of Tegucigalpa, Honduras

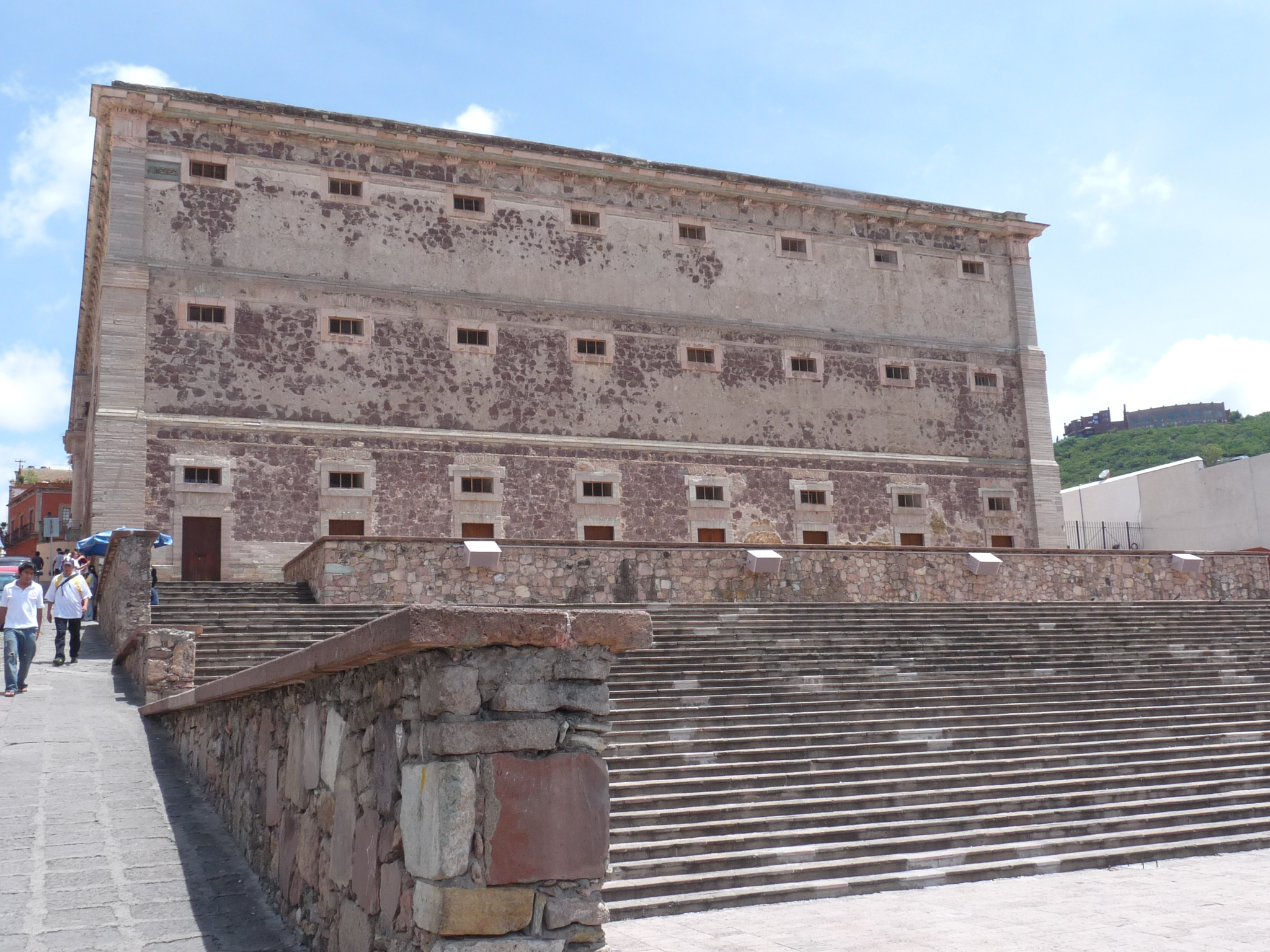
Alhóndiga de Granaditas, Guanajuato, Mexico

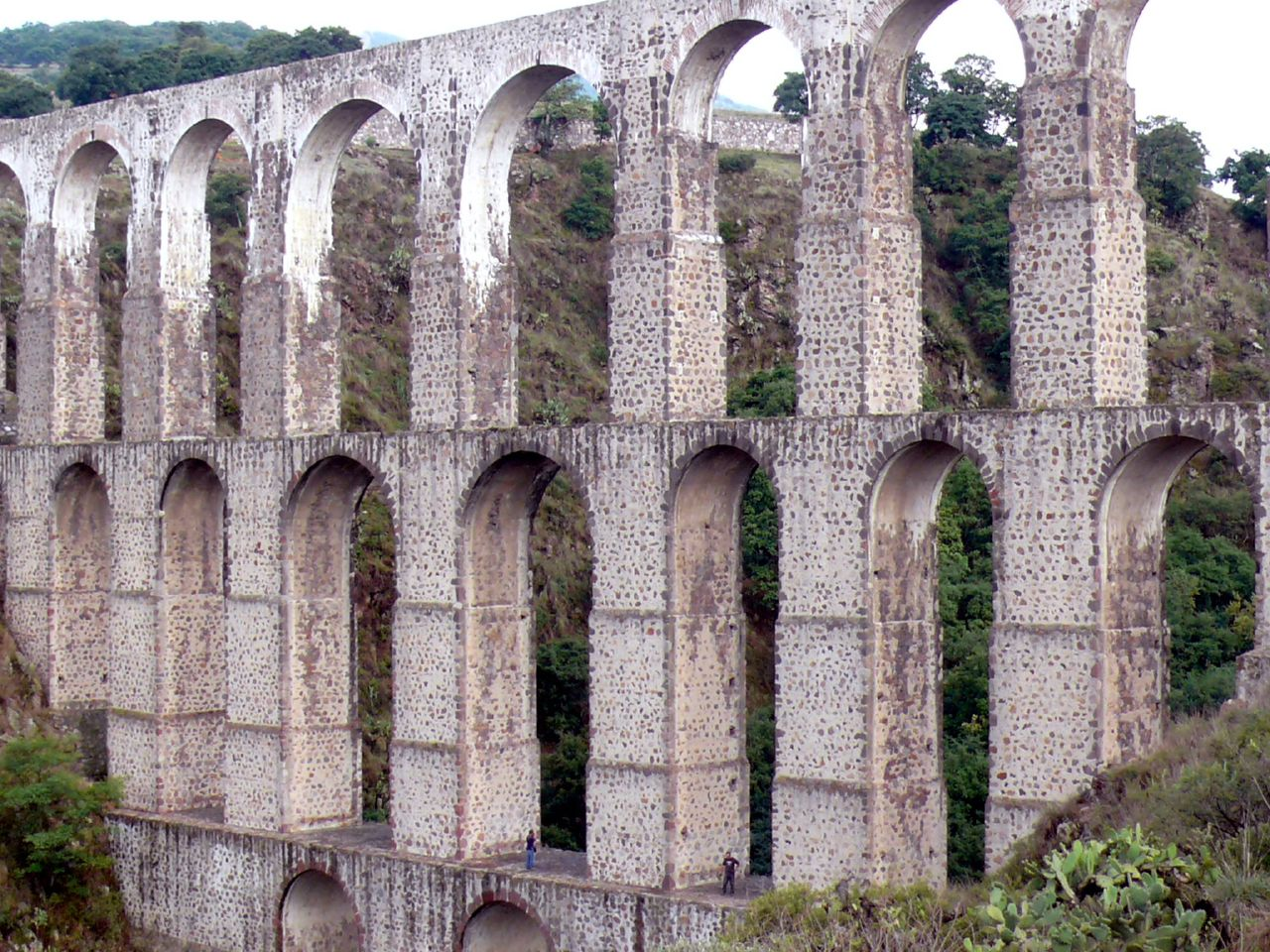
Aqueduct of Xalpa, Tepotzotlán, Mexico

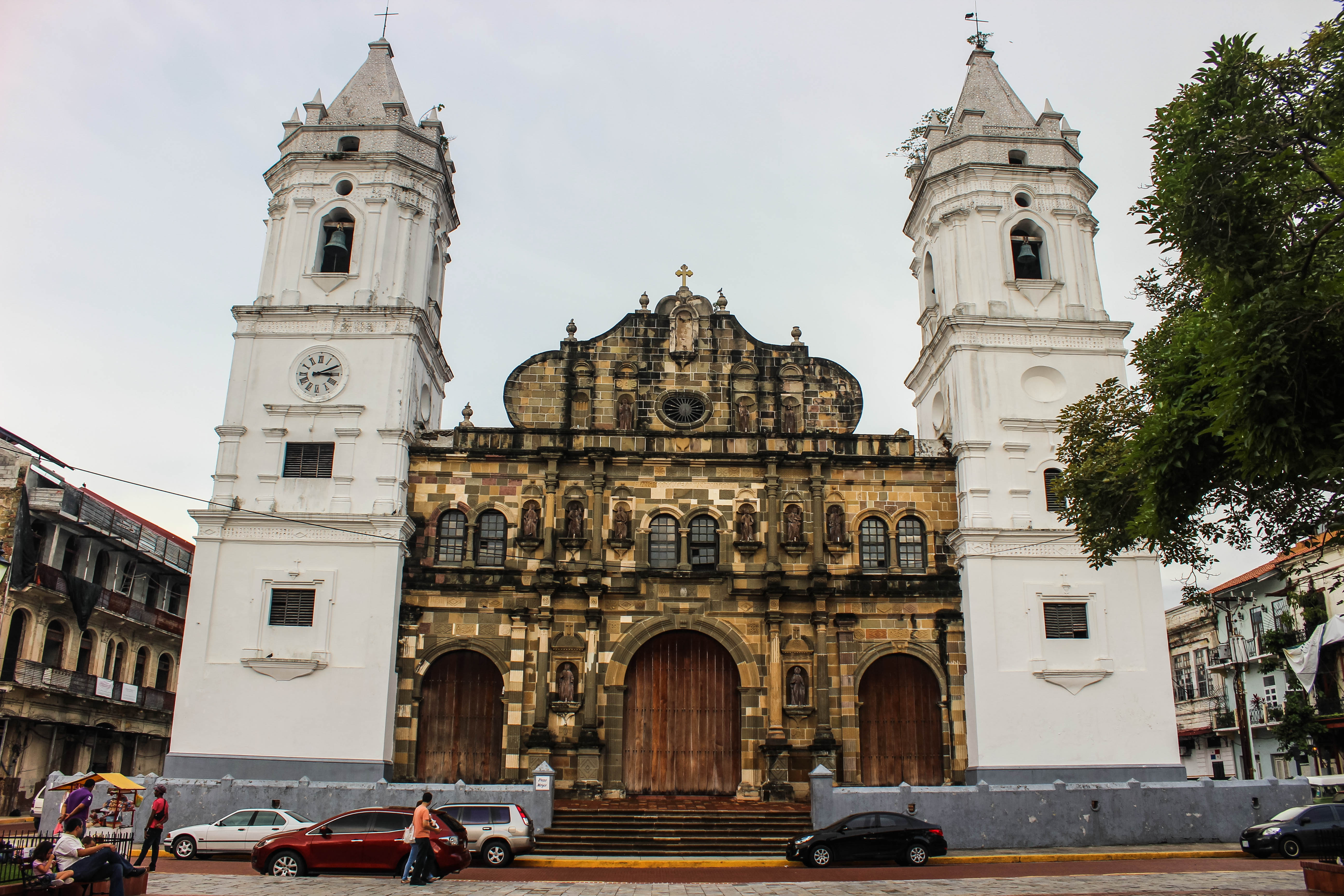
Metropolitan Cathedral of Panama City, Panama City, Panama

== See also ==
- Andean Baroque
- Churrigueresque
- New Spanish Baroque
- Presidio
- Spanish Baroque architecture – evolved in Spain and its colonies
- Spanish architecture
- Bahay na bato
- Spanish Colonial Revival architecture
- Spanish missions in the Americas
- Mission Revival Style architecture
- Mediterranean Revival architecture
- Ancestral houses of the Philippines
