= Plan Serena =

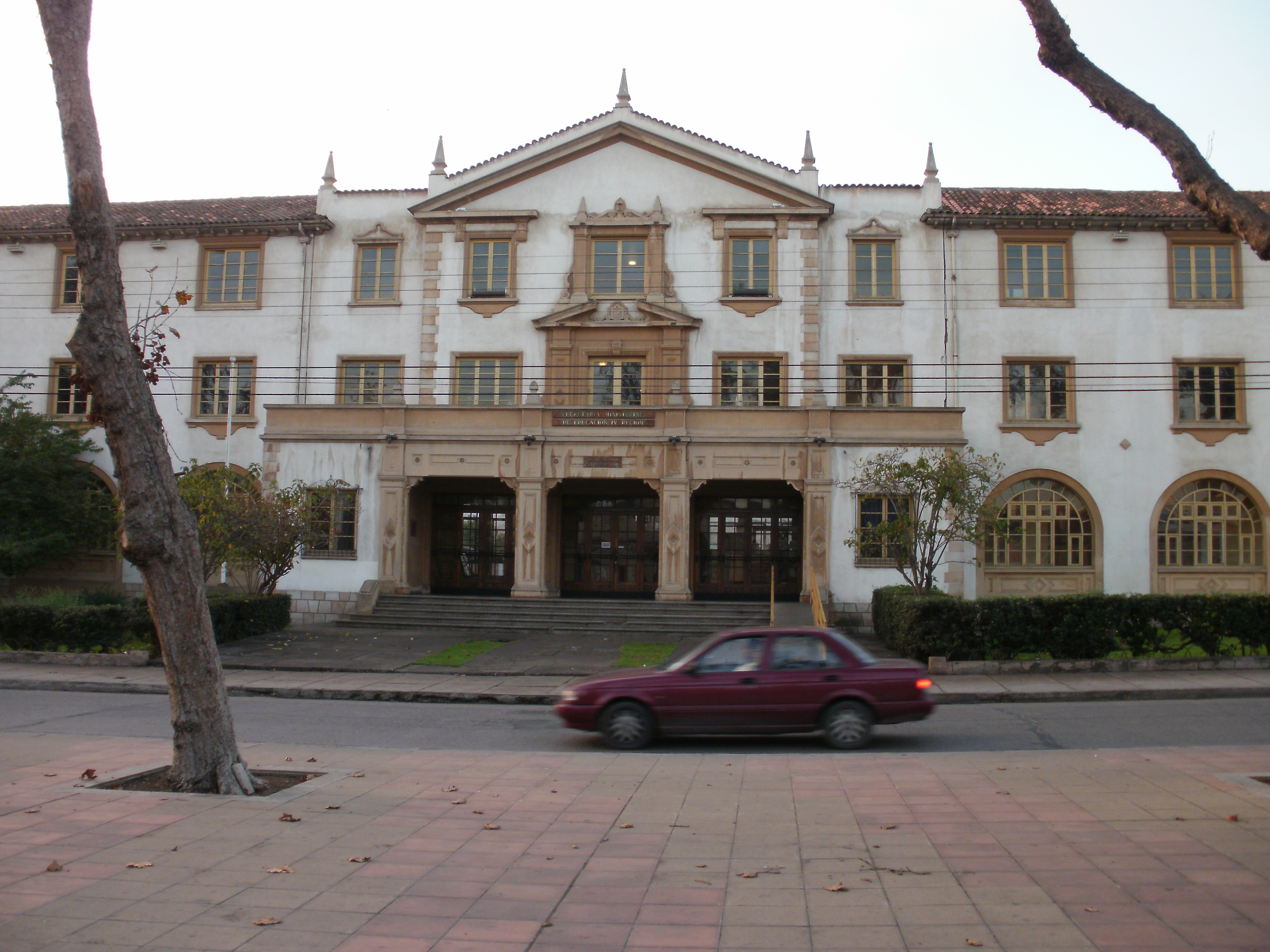
Coquimbo Regional Ministerial Secretary of Education, was built in 1950 as part of Gabriel González Videla administration's Plan Serena that introduced a neocolonial theme to the city centre.

Plan Serena was a major urbanistic project in the Chilean city of La Serena which included restoring the old city, building new public schools and new buildings for several public services. The project took place between 1948 and 1952 and left La Serena with its characteristic neocolonial (i.e. Spanish Colonial Revival) architecture style. The works were not restricted to La Serena but included the whole province including the port city of Coquimbo. The project took place during the presidency of Gabriel González Videla, a native of La Serena.

== See also ==
- Spanish Colonial Revival architecture
- Churches of Chiloé
- Sewell
