= Mañio =

Mañio is a common name that may refer to the following trees of the Valdivian temperate rainforest:

- Saxegothaea conspicua
- Podocarpus nubigenus
- Podocarpus salignus
