= Massimiliano Soldani Benzi =

Italian sculptor (1656–1740)

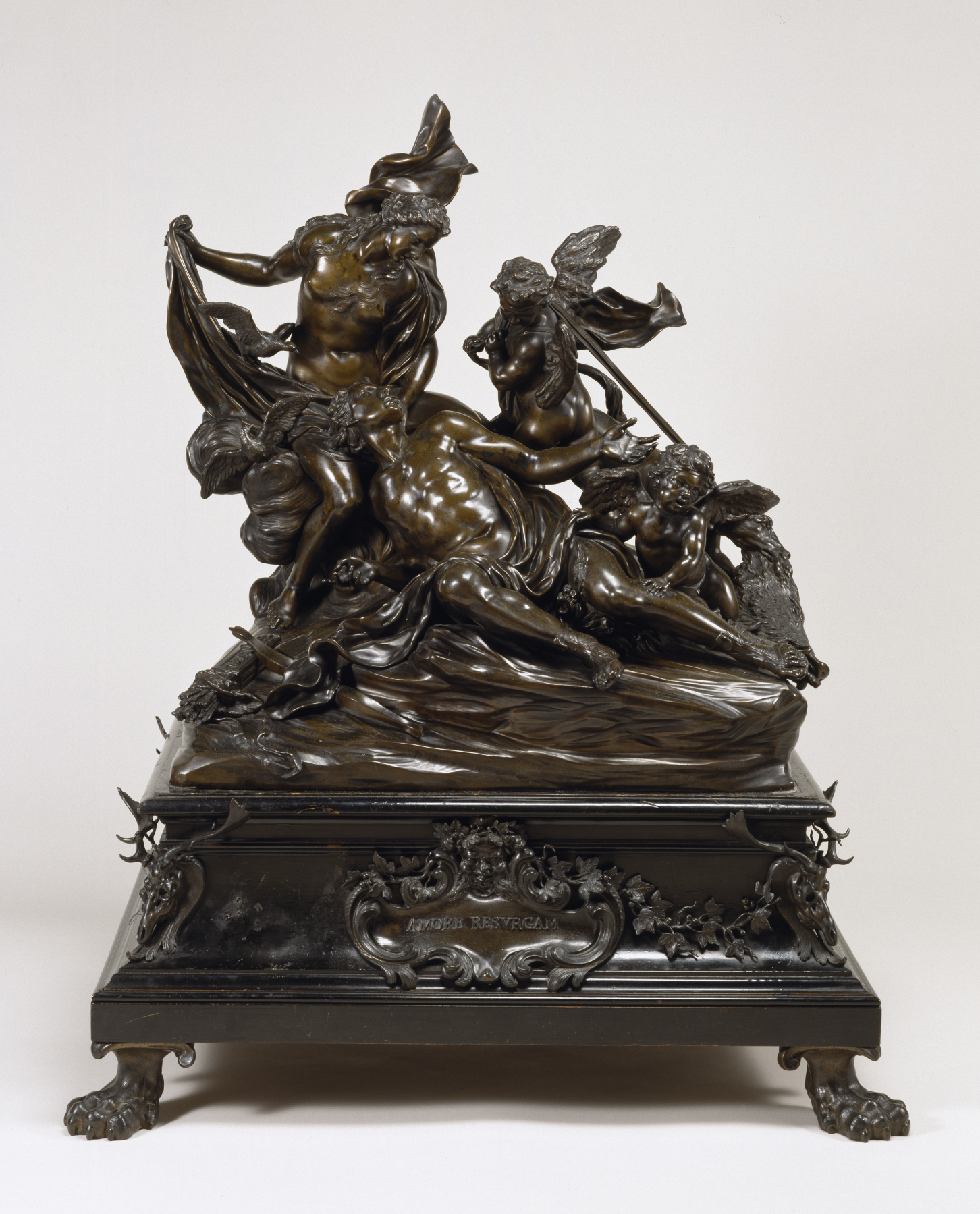
Adonis Mourned by Venus and Cupids (circa 1715)

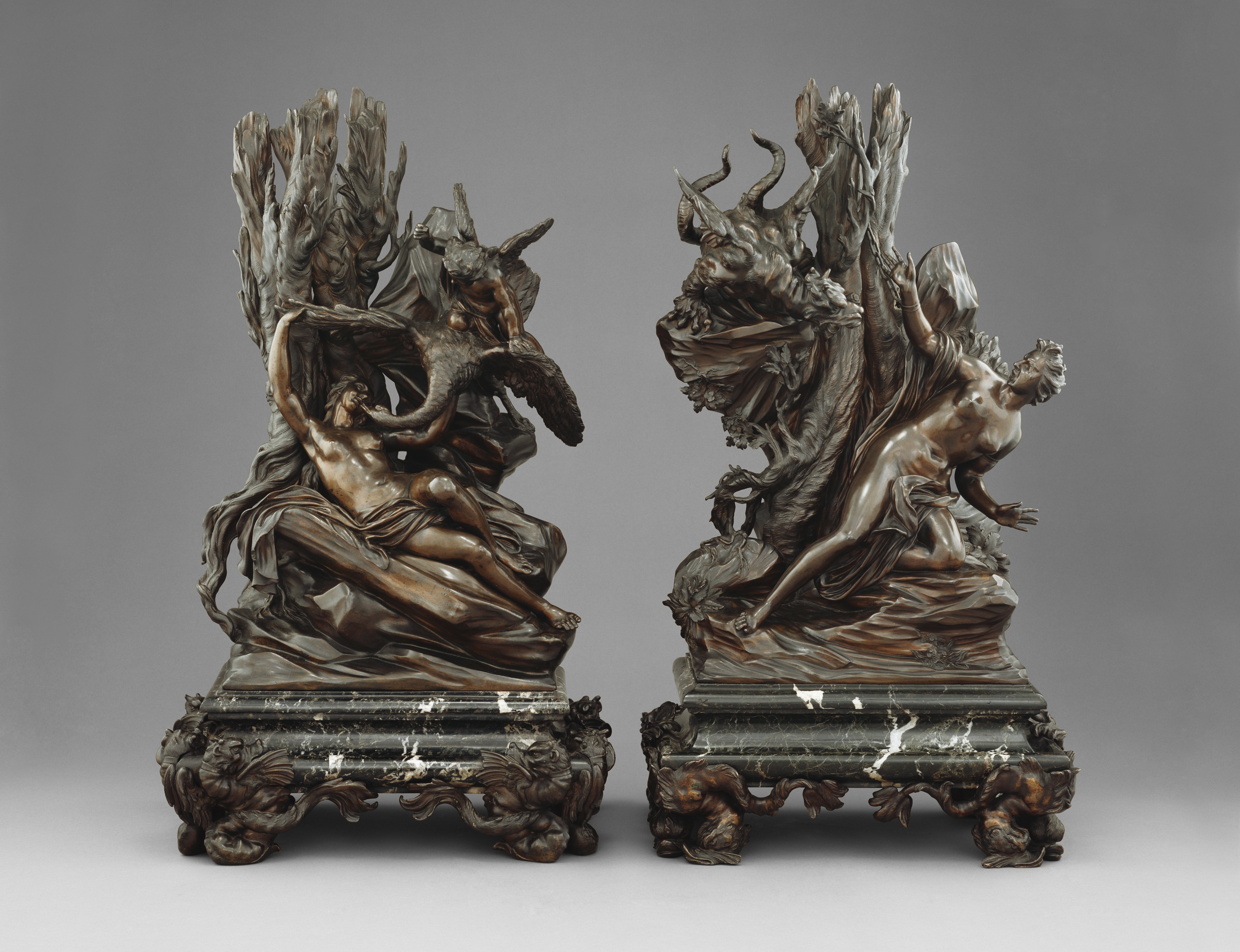
Leda and the Swan (left), Andromeda and the Sea Monster (right)

Massimiliano Soldani or Massimiliano Soldani Benzi (15 July 1656 – 23 February 1740) was an Italian baroque sculptor and medallist, mainly active in Florence. Born at Montevarchi, the son of a Tuscan cavalry captain, Soldani was employed by the Medici for his entire career.

== Name ==
He first went under the name Soldani but, claiming descent from the family of bishop Soldani of Fiesole and from the aristocratic Benzi family of Figline, he applied for and received, in 1693, an official letter acknowledging his nobility based on this ancestry. From this date forward, he called himself, and is referred to in many documents as, Soldani Benzi.

== Life ==
Soldani began training in the Medici drawing school in Florence. He attracted the attention of Grand Duke Cosimo III de' Medici who sent Soldani to his grand-ducal academy in Rome to study under Ciro Ferri and Ercole Ferrata, and to train in coining. During his years in Rome (1678–81), he showed much promise and was asked by Queen Christina of Sweden to create several medals. He started this enterprise but left it unfinished as Cosimo transferred the artist to Paris to work with the famous medallist Joseph Roettiers.

While there in 1682, Soldani came into contact with Charles Le Brun and minister Jean-Baptiste Colbert. Learning that the artist was working on a medal portrait of King Louis XIV, a courtier Soldani refers to the courtier as "Mons.r Duca d'Homone" (possibly Louis, duc d'Aumont who was very interested in the art of medals) introduced the young man to the king. The model for this medal of Louis XIV is now in the Art Gallery of Ontario in Toronto.

Grand Duke Cosimo in the meantime decided that it was time for Soldani to return to Florence and take charge of the Grand-ducal Mint, the job he was meant to occupy from the very start. Upon the death of the current director, Soldani was officially made Maestro dei Coni e Custode della Zecca in 1688. As such he had his workshop and living quarters in the Uffizi.

When he finally gave up work at the age of about 80, Soldani Benzi retired to his Villa Petrolo near Bucine where he died in 1740.

== Work ==
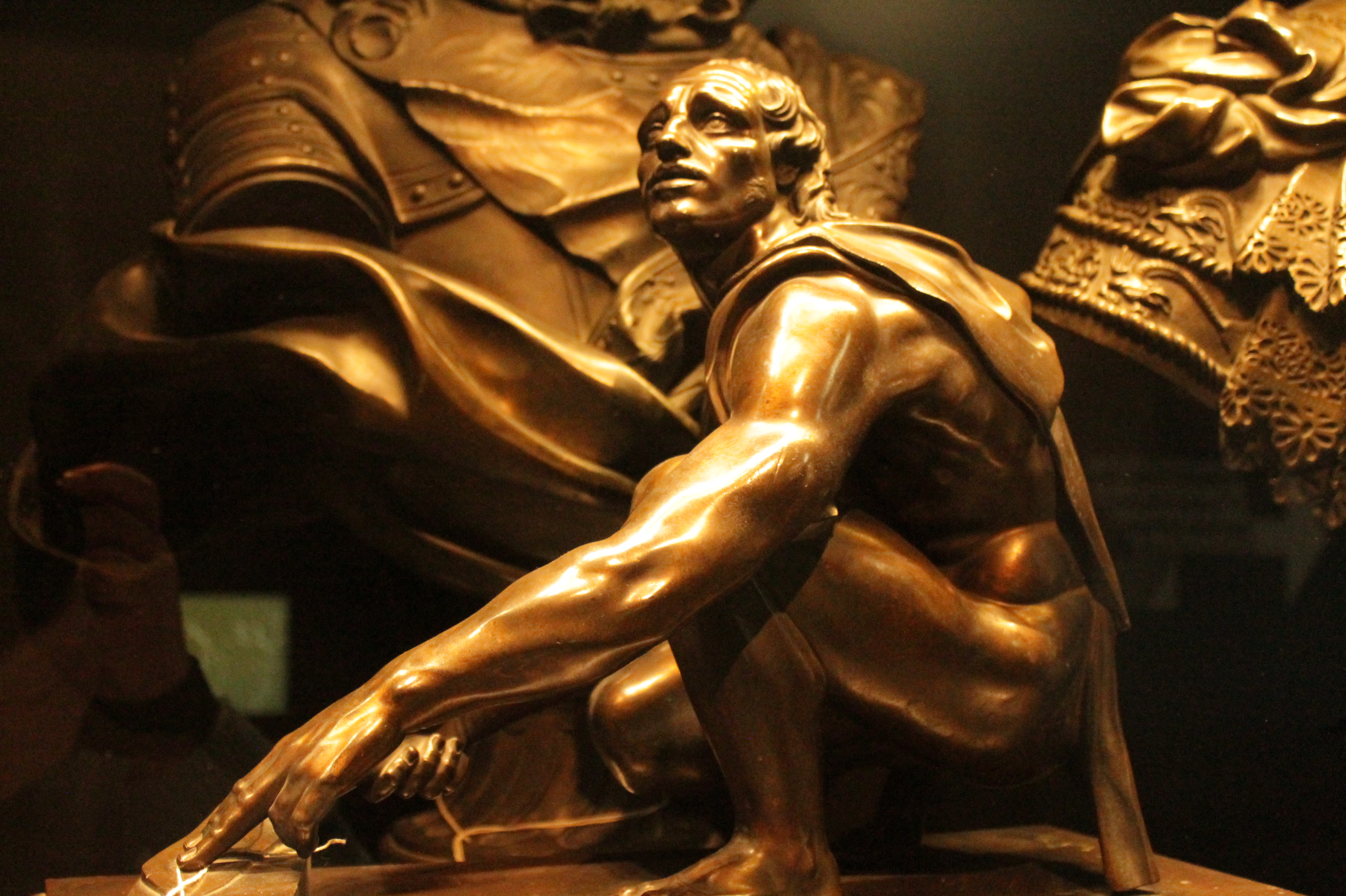
The knife grinder by Massimiliano Soldani (c.1700), Albertinum, Dresden

Soldani developed into one of the finest bronze casters of his time in Europe. Though first specialising as a medallist, Soldani also produced bronze reliefs, bronze vases and free-standing figures and busts.

For Joseph Johann Adam, Prince of Liechtenstein, he produced a series of bronze copies of works of the Medici collection, mainly antique busts and figures but also after works by Michelangelo and Gianlorenzo Bernini.

Klaus Lankheit recognized in a small bronze Pietà attributed to Soldani at the Walters Art Museum a "balanced triangular composition" that is "almost a relief in form" and suggested that it had been composed first as a relief; A more elaborate version, with additional figures, in the Kress collection at the Seattle Art Museum, was identified as by Soldani by Ulrich Middeldorf. A second table bronze, Venus and the Wounded Adonis, on a richly-mounted ebony base raised on bronze paw feet, is also at the Walters Art Museum.

At rare intervals he exhibited terra cotta bozzetti at the irregularly staged exhibitions of the Accademia del Disegno, Florence: in 1715 a Pietà in terracotta by "Sig. M.S." A highly finished terracotta relief, Agony in the Garden of Gethsemane, doubtless intended as a modello to be cast in bronze as a private devotional work, is in the Metropolitan Museum of Art.

A major document of his career is his autobiography, dated 1718, correspondence, and the inventory taken after his death.

A collection of his drawings is in the Uffizi in Florence.

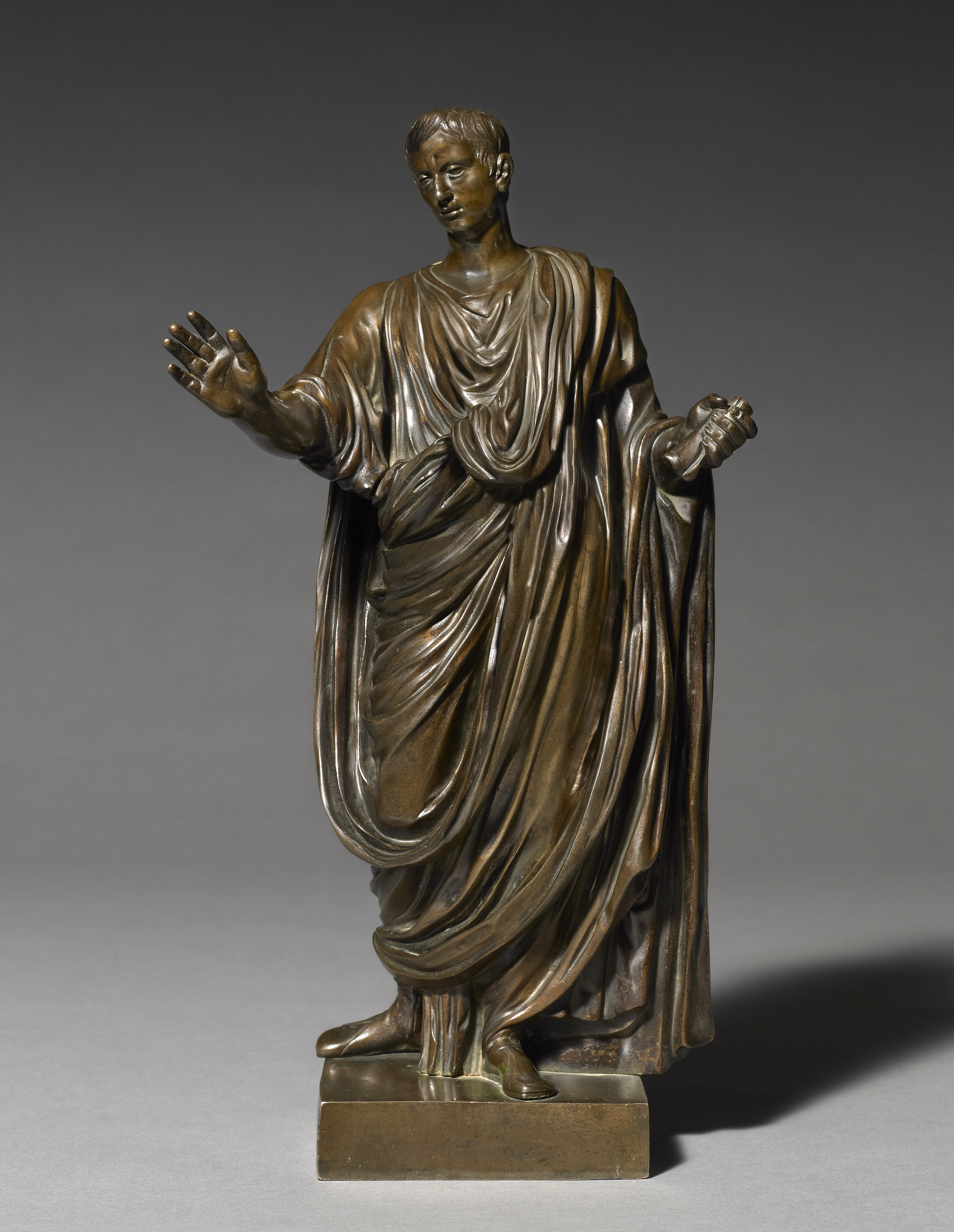
Augustus Togatus, Mougins Museum of Classical Art

== Doccia ==
After his death, his heirs sold some of his wax models to marchese Carlo Ginori, who had them adapted by his chief modeller, Gaspero Bruschi, and reproduced in porcelain at his Doccia porcelain manufactory near Florence. Thus Soldani's Apollo in His Chariot, Venus Plucking the Wings of Cupid and Virtue Overpowering Vice all exist as Doccia porcelain groups.
