= Doccia porcelain =

Italian porcelain manufactory founded in 1735

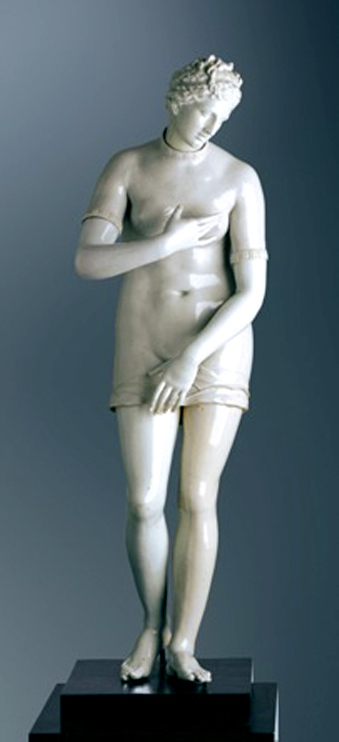
Gaspero Bruschi (?), Venus de' Medici (life-size copy statue). Ginori at Doccia, c. 1747. Museo Richard-Ginori della Manifattura di Doccia.

Doccia porcelain, now usually called Richard-Ginori (or Ginori 1735; previously known as the Doccia porcelain manufactory), at Doccia, was one of the most prestigious European porcelain factories. It was founded in 1737 by Marquis Carlo Ginori in a villa he owned in Doccia, now part of Sesto Fiorentino, Florence. The descendants of Carlo Ginori continued to own and manage it until 1896, when it merged with the Richard Ceramic Society of Milan.

"The artistic development of the Doccia Manufactory is particularly complex and [...] a reflection of the different historical and cultural circumstances that unfolded in the history of Tuscany over approximately one hundred and fifty years, from the fall of the last Medici to the years of Florence as the Capital".

== The first period: Carlo Ginori ==
The Ginori manufactory began operations in 1737 in Doccia, a locality a few kilometers from the ancient village of Sesto Fiorentino, (Note: Now incorporated into the northern area of the city.) in a villa purchased by Marquis Carlo Ginori earlier that year from Senator Francesco Buondelmonti (1689–1774), adjacent to the ancestral family villa. In July 1737, the first batch came out of the factory's kilns. It was managed by the Roman kiln master Francesco Leonelli, who left Doccia between August and October 1738.

These initial results were the outcome of bold experiments conducted by the Marquis himself, a scholar of alchemical and chemical texts (Note: "The foundations of Carlo Ginori's chemical knowledge are primarily based on the works of five significant figures: Johannes Kunckel, Pierre Joseph Macquer, René-Antoine Ferchault de Réaumur, Johann Heinrich Pott, and Nicolas Lefevre".) and a chemist in his own right. (Note: It is documented that the Marquis established and equipped a "Chemistry Cabinet" in his palace on Via de' Ginori in Florence.) His chemical expertise was further enriched by a close friendship with Giovanni Targioni Tozzetti, which, in the past, erroneously led to the assumption that the eminent Florentine naturalist served as an arcanist (Note: In the 18th century, an arcanist (from the Latin arcanum, meaning secret) was a chemist believed to possess the secret to producing porcelain in imitation of Chinese and Japanese wares.) at the start of the Ginori manufactory's operations. However, archival documentation confirms that Carlo was "the sole and only arcanist" within the manufactory.

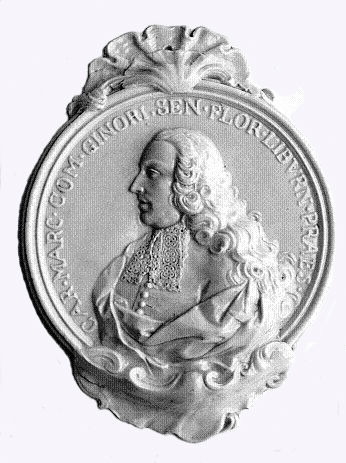
Porcelain medallion with the portrait of Marquis Carlo Ginori. Ginori at Doccia, c. 1745. Museo Richard-Ginori della Manifattura di Doccia.

As evidence of his tireless research on porcelain, Carlo wrote a booklet titled Theory of Ingredients Suitable for Making Porcelain, in which he recorded factory experiments, personal concerns, expectations, chemical knowledge, and critiques of known chemical and alchemical texts.

Throughout his life, he personally oversaw the composition of mixtures, the sourcing of the finest clays—most notably those from the Tretto Valley near Vicenza (Note: This is the clay referred to in archival documents as "Clay brought from Venice".) and from Montecarlo (Note: Carlo Ginori's relentless research and experimentation with clays aimed to achieve the best results. Among the earliest clays used and documented are those from: Siena (various locations), Sestino, Montecarlo (various locations), Pescia, Portoferraio, Arezzo, Galluzzo, Castelfranco di Sotto, Modigliana, Scarperia, Altopascio, Sansepolcro, Sesto Fiorentino, Fiesole, Barga, Monte Morello, Pistoia, and Pietrasanta.)—and the development of kilns, either through his direct presence or detailed reports, even managing operations remotely during frequent travels. (Note: In 1742, during a stay in Vienna, he wrote to his wife Elisabetta Corsini: "Tell Jacopino that if the crucibles with the latest Montecarlo clay crack, he can try them with three parts of said Montecarlo clay and one part of the same crucibles that have been in the kiln and ground." He thus instructed to reuse cracked crucibles from firing, grind them, and mix them with Montecarlo clay for new pastes.)

Initial attempts likely focused on maiolica and perhaps tentative efforts to produce porcelain, with the first documented porcelain production noted on 6 July 1739, when a payment was recorded "to the kiln workers of the porcelains". Joannon de Saint Laurent, a learned Lorrainer and close collaborator of Carlo and later Lorenzo Ginori, attested that: "[...] the production of porcelain is the main objective of the enterprise, while maiolica is merely a secondary accessory discovered by the fortunate memory of Marquis Carlo to more successfully support the former".

Thus, it is confirmed that porcelain experimentation was initially supported financially by the production and sale of maiolica, and the reference to the "fortunate memory" highlights the familiarity and attention to ceramics that Carlo developed in a family environment from a young age. (Note: Documents preserved in the Ginori Lisci family archive reveal that Carlo's father, Lorenzo Ginori, had a white/blue porcelain service, bearing the family crest, imported from the East via Goa and Lisbon, called the "Nagasaki Service" in the Ginori household.)

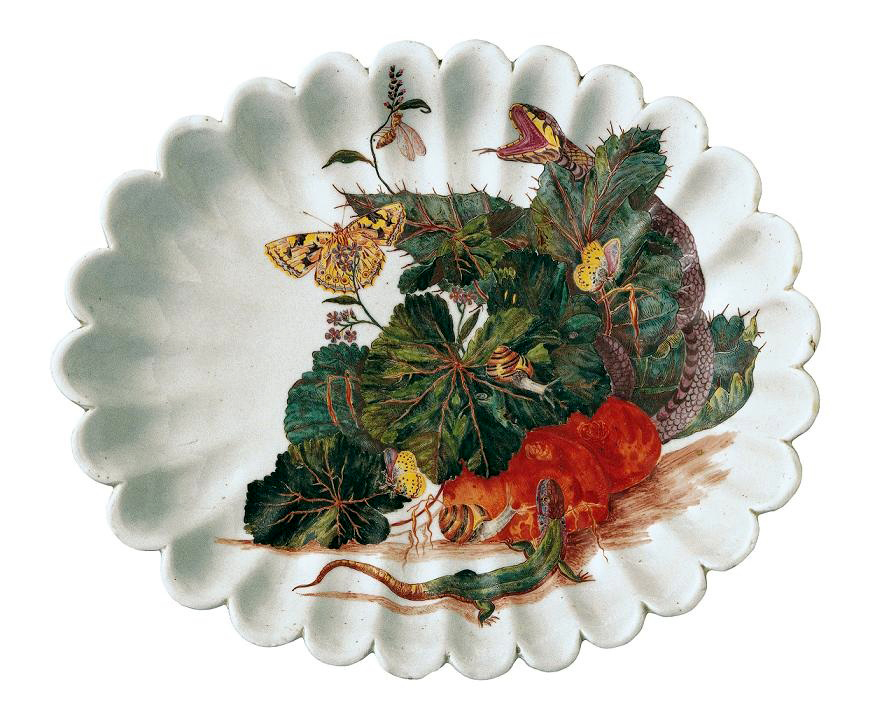
Anton Anreiter von Ziernfeld, Fruit bowl decorated with Plants and snakes painted naturally. Ginori at Doccia, dated 1746. Museo Richard-Ginori della Manifattura di Doccia.

The earliest datable Doccia porcelains are from 1740: these are finely painted cups by the manufactory's chief painter, Johann Carl Wendelin Anreiter von Zirnfeld, who brought them to Vienna to present to the future Grand Duke of Tuscany, Francis Stephen of Lorraine, as first noted by Leonardo Ginori Lisci in 1963. Anreiter's journey carried Carlo Ginori's hopes of obtaining "[...] the coveted privilege for porcelain production in the Grand Duchy of Tuscany", granted on 3 March 1741 by the president of the regency council, Marc de Beauvau, Prince of Craon.

Carlo Ginori persuaded the young Carl Anreiter to join him in Florence in 1737 during a trip to Vienna to pay homage to the new Grand Duke of Tuscany. Anreiter was a painter of considerable talent, born in Schemnitz (now Banská Štiavnica, Slovakia) to parents from Bolzano, where he spent his childhood. After artistic studies, he moved to the Austrian capital, working as a salaried decorator at the Vienna porcelain du Paquier manufactory, later operating as an independent Hausmaler. (Note: In Germany, Hausmaler were independent painters, such as those in Augsburg, who purchased white pieces from manufactories such as Meissen porcelain and decorated them in their home workshops.)

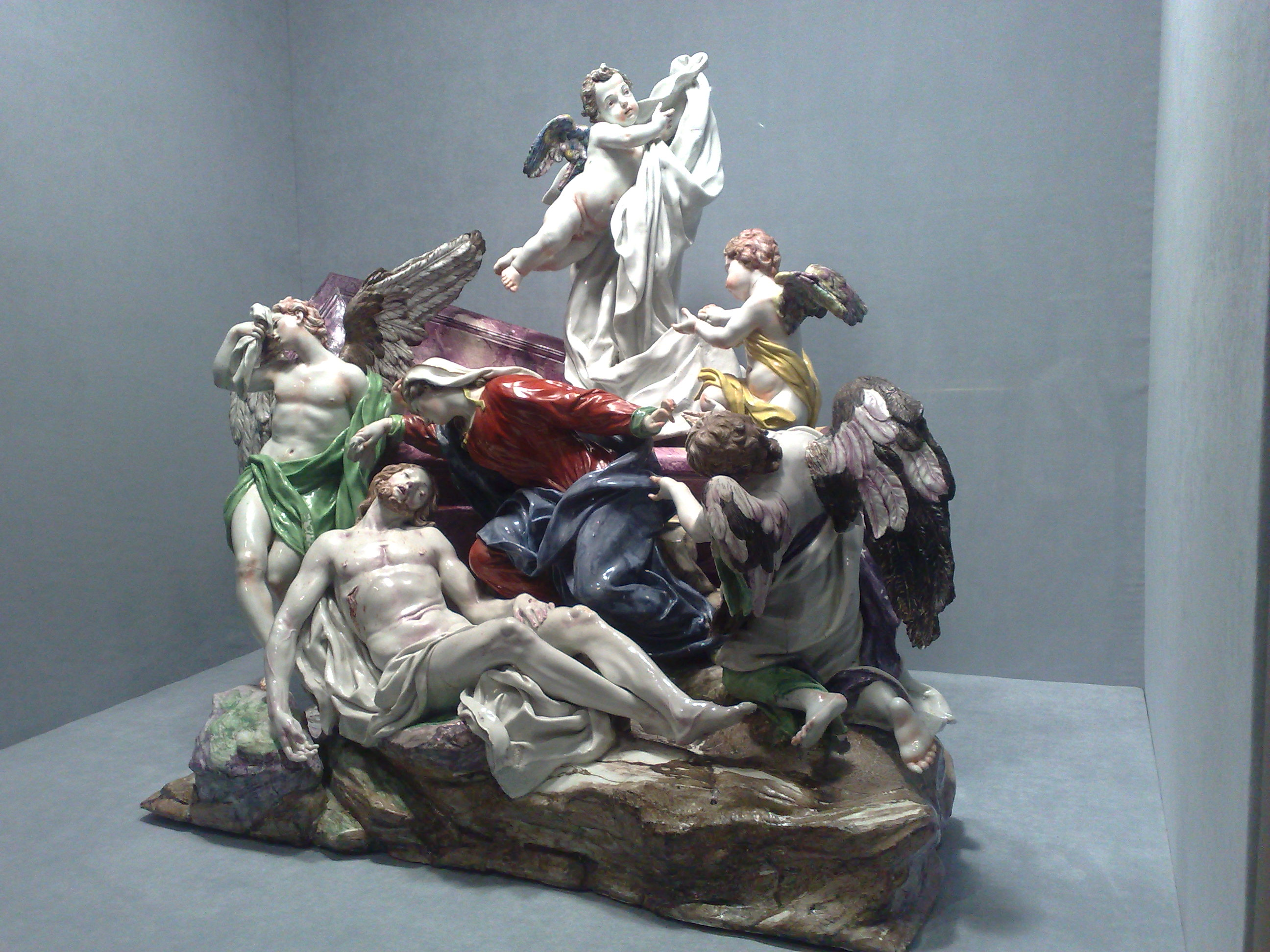
Gaspero Bruschi, Pietà, (from a model by Massimiliano Soldani Benzi). Ginori at Doccia, c. 1745. Los Angeles County Museum of Art.

Anreiter was hired under a formal contract both as a painter and as head of the painters to "gild and paint with enamel on clays, porcelains, and other materials, (Note: Inventories list various subjects painted by Carl and Anton Anreiter, including: "The towing of cannons", "With battle scenes", "With oriental figures", "With street trade scenes", "With plants and snakes painted naturally" (the latter by Anton).) and to teach everything he knows to those assigned by the aforementioned Count Ginori". He arrived in Florence with his wife and children, including Anton Anreiter, who became an excellent porcelain painter, first at Doccia and later in Vienna. (Note: The study of this artist is primarily due to Alessandro Biancalana in The Figure of a Second Johan Karl Anreiter, Son of Karl Wendelin, published in the journal Ceramica Antica, October 1999, and also "Johann Karl Wendelin Anreiter von Ziernfeld," in Der Schlern, 2000, no. 74.)

Marquis Carlo Ginori, a prominent figure in the European political, scientific, and cultural landscape of the early 18th century, quickly surrounded himself with individuals who enabled the factory he founded to rival Europe's leading manufactories in stylistic and formal quality.

Notable among them:

- Gaspero Bruschi, a young sculptor and former student of the Accademia delle Arti del Disegno, appointed to lead the section "for the rooms of models and molds";
- Johann Georg Deledori, also known as Giorgio delle Torri in recent studies, an Austrian who headed the kiln department;
- Jacopo Fanciullacci (Note: Jacopo Fanciullacci (1705–1793) was the most prominent member of the family. He oversaw the kilns, served as the arcanist, and acted as the "Minister" (administrative manager) of the Manufactory from its establishment. His father, Francesco, was likely a tenant farmer for the Ginori family. Jacopo's sons, Anton Maria and Giovan Battista, along with their descendants, held administrative or painting roles in the manufactory until their dismissal by Lorenzo II Ginori.), who initially assisted Deledori, later replacing him in the spring of 1743 when Deledori returned to Vienna, and subsequently took charge of the "preparation of clays and glazes";
- Nicholas Lhetournaus, (Note: Regarding the certainty of the name, Biancalana writes: "[...] The spelling of the name Lhetournaus is not consistent: Le Torneau, Chethournaus, or Leturnò, but Nicholas Lhetournaus seems the most reliable, derived from the ceramist's handwritten signature. [...] The Frenchman's arrival in Italy may date to 1737 if he is the same painter referred to as a certain Nicola Netturnò, French, who was recorded at the Antonibon Manufactory in Nove until August 27, 1737 [...].") a ceramist from Nevers, France, appointed to manage the maiolica manufactory "in his country house at Doccia", who died just a few months after arriving in Florence.

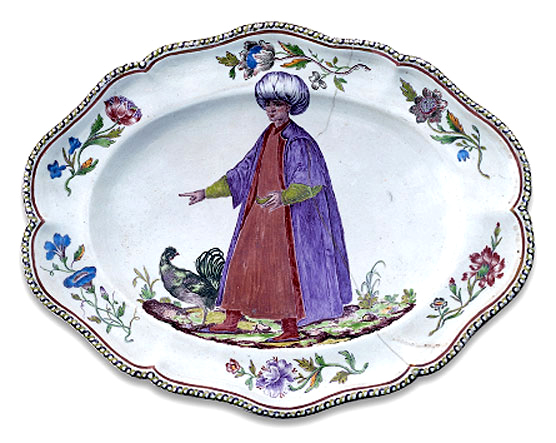
Tray with a figure of a noble Turk. Ginori at Doccia, c. 1745. Museo Richard-Ginori della Manifattura di Doccia.

Marquis Carlo's vision to ensure artistic and productive continuity in the manufactory is evident in his persistent efforts to establish a school within the factory, where artists served as masters and the most capable and willing workers as apprentices, and in the fact that Carlo Ginori secured two spots for the most promising young talents at the prestigious Accademia delle Arti del Disegno.

The factory was established using almost exclusively the tenant farmers of the Doccia estate, who quickly became painters, turners, kiln workers, and paste manipulators with remarkable results.

Regarding the decorative styles used in the Ginori manufactory during the first period, Alessandro Biancalana notes the presence of non-exhaustive inventories from which to draw information about various decorative types. He considers that "The first of these lists is contained in the Inventory of Porcelains and Maiolicas Found on This Day, 25 October 1743, in the Warehouse in the Hands of Giuseppe Sarti".

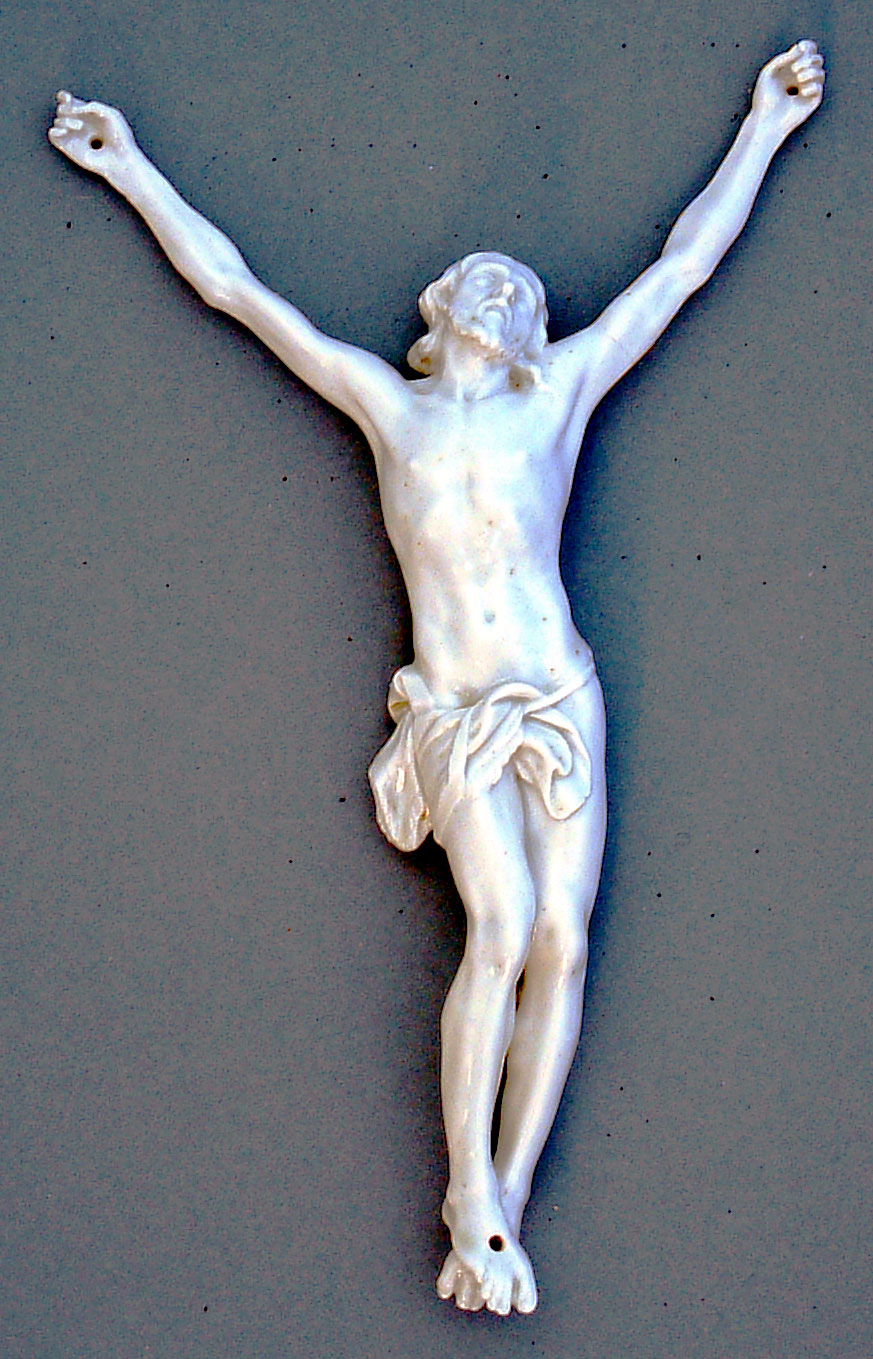
Porcelain crucifix. Ginori at Doccia, mid-18th century.

Over time, attempts have been made to codify these decorations, often encountering designs not traceable to any known object or document. To find a common thread in studying these decorations, several factors must be considered: actual tests, the presence of unique pieces, the genius and creativity of the finest painters, noble commissions, court orders, replacements made in the factory, and the lists compiled at the manufactory.

Among the most common decorations: the "printed" decoration, or "stencilled", strictly in white/blue, one of the first produced at the Doccia factory; the "rooster" decoration (in black/red/gold, blue/gold, and green) clearly of Asian origin; the "flower bouquets" decoration; the so-called "Saxon" (after Meissen) and "tulip" decorations, the latter two being modern terms not found in factory lists. These are among the most sought-after and, in some cases, result from a blend of Eastern-inspired styles and battle themes (for the latter, d’Agliano suggests a more autonomous interpretation by Carl Wendelin Anreiter) successfully experimented with at Meissen (e.g., the gold paintings of Johann Gregorius Höroldt) since 1723: (Note: "Among these is a teapot preserved at the Doccia Porcelain Museum, datable around 1740–45, which deliberately echoes one of the chinoiserie motifs typical of Johann Gregorius Höroldt.") the "red landscapes" decoration, "Chinese figures all in rich gold", (Note: This decorative theme, painted with Chinese characters and made with extensive use of gold, is described in ancient factory inventories.) "Chinese palaces", (Note: These are characteristic Chinese buildings widely reproduced in Western paintings and prints of the 17th century and 18th century.) "historiated bas-relief" decoration, and the rare "Turks" figures inspired by the tempera paintings of Jacopo Ligozzi, all typical from the earliest years. The most reliable sources for a scientific study of the decorations are undoubtedly those linked to production and sales lists compiled during various periods of the Ginori manufactory's history and those derived from epistolary exchanges.

It is in the field of sculpture, including religious works, that the Ginori factory distinguished itself most in its early years, producing bold large-scale plastic expressions led by chief modeler Gaspero Bruschi. Following Carlo Ginori's guidance, Bruschi drew inspiration from classical models, in continuity with the "[...] classicist cultural koiné of the Florentine artistic world, which, in some respects, anticipates the style of neoclassicism by a few decades, forming almost a bridge between Tuscan Baroque sculpture and the early signs of what would become neoclassicism." (Note: Based on recent studies, Biancalana concludes that "One cannot yet speak of neoclassicism, which would only establish itself a few decades later".) This was the main difference between the Doccia manufactory and other Italian manufactories in the first half of the 18th century.

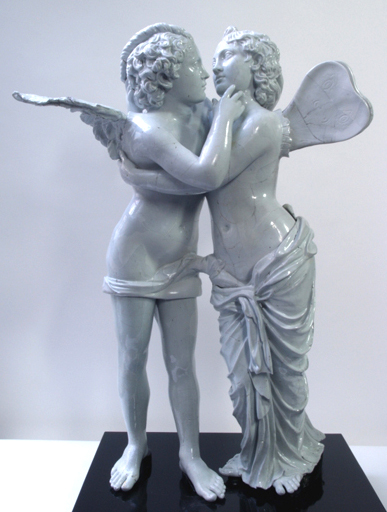
Gaspero Bruschi, Cupid and Psyche, Ginori at Doccia, 1747. International Museum of Ceramics in Faenza.

A remarkable body of works includes the large groups created between approximately 1747 and 1755, primarily mythological and religious subjects, often derived from late Baroque Florentine sculptors such as Massimiliano Soldani Benzi, Giovan Battista Foggini, Giuseppe Piamontini, Girolamo Ticciati, and Agostino Cornacchini, (Note: "Of particular interest are the groups derived from bronzes by Agostino Cornacchini, such as Wounded Adonis and Sleeping Endymion [...] The examples derived from Cornacchini's models are characterized by a style free of the tensions, sometimes dramatic, found in Soldani Benzi's sculptures. Compared to the latter, the forms are softer, with greater fluidity, though occasionally accompanied by a more languid gesture.") (Note: "One might also venture to say that this desire to reuse existing sculptural resources and waste nothing is very Tuscan. It is a pragmatic approach to life's riches, undoubtedly mixed with deep pride in the past. This phenomenon would reach its peak later with the creation of the glorious 'Tempietto' in Cortona.") from whom, directly or through their heirs, Carlo Ginori began purchasing models as early as 1737. Roman Baroque sculptors such as Bernini, Algardi, and Pierre Le Gros also served as sources, though to a lesser extent, for Doccia's sculptures.

In addition to the leading sculptors of the time, Carlo Ginori drew on bronze workers, plasterers, engravers, and carvers for both sculptural models and relief decorations, including Filippo Bosi, Orazio Filippini, the noted Florentine engraver Carlo Gregori, Andrea Scacciati, Gio Batta Ricchini, and Jacopo Bronzoli. Beyond his beloved Florence, he sourced models from various cities, including Marseille, Lucca, Paris, and especially Rome, from where many models were sent starting from the manufactory's early years. Carlo Ginori ensured that his best modelers and plasterers, such as Filippo Della Valle, Bartolomeo Cavaceppi, and Francesco Lici, were sent to Rome to create copies for porcelain reproduction. This extensive work is evidenced by the vast correspondence between the Marquis and the Roman scholar and engraver Guido Bottari, whose connections in the Roman Curia were invaluable, as well as by the frequent and documented shipments of crates containing models from the Eternal City.

There is also detailed information about the significant, sometimes life-sized, models created from sculptures, including the famous Twilight by Michelangelo from the New Sacristy of San Lorenzo in Florence. (Note: "Filippo Della Valle's reference may be to a copy of Michelangelo's Evening (or "Twilight") statue in the New Sacristy of San Lorenzo in Florence. This statue was made of porcelain and is preserved at the Sforza Castle Museum in Milan." Additional pieces were drawn from the classical repertoire housed in Roman palaces.)

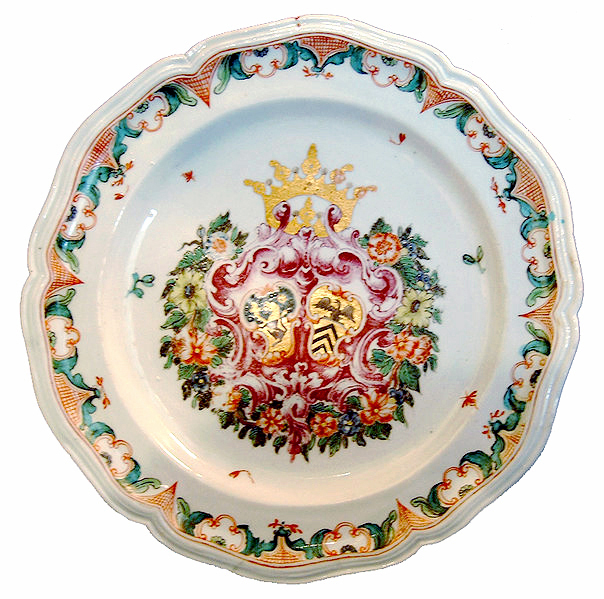
Plate decorated with the coat of arms of the Isola Marana family of Genoa. Ginori at Doccia, mid-18th century.

As noted by Giuseppe Morazzoni in 1932, in the realm of plastic works, the Doccia manufactory succeeded in equaling, and perhaps surpassing, the celebrated Meissen manufactory (Note: "Thanks to the Marquis Ginori, Doccia's masso bastardo holds its own in regard to the boldness of its modeling compared to Meissen. Sometimes, due to the significant scale of its plastic works, it surpasses all European manufactories.") in an ideal continuum, as Biancalana notes today, with the great Florentine tradition of the Della Robbia family, whom Marquis Ginori admired both for their innovative approach that brought them prominence during the Florentine Renaissance with large-scale glazed terracotta works and for their "scientific" research on materials specific to the ceramic arts. (Note: The term arte figulina refers to the potter's art (from the Latin figulina, feminine of figulinus, derived from figulus, meaning one who works with clay, a potter).)

By drawing on the Della Robbia, Carlo Ginori achieved a dual result: on one hand, he "freed porcelain from its purely practical function and brought about a formal and ideological revival of the Renaissance [...]".

Evidence of this ambition includes surviving works such as the famous group of "Cupid and Psyche", first produced by Bruschi in 1747 from a Hellenistic model preserved at the Uffizi, with two smaller replicas known, (Note: "Cupid and Psyche, 1747, forms by Nicola Kinderman and Gaetano Traballesi from a Hellenistic model preserved at the Florence Gallery [Uffizi].") the "Great Corsini Pietà", the re-edition of the famous "Laocoön", the superb "Machine" or "Small temple dedicated to the Glory of Tuscany" for the Etruscan Academy of Cortona, of which Carlo Ginori became a Lucumo in 1756, and the historiated bas-reliefs, including the well-known series of the "Four Seasons" created by Anton Filippo Maria Weber.

The manufactory's artisans expressed their creativity through tableware, including coffee pots, teapots, tureens, and sugar bowls. These pieces feature intricate, double-walled designs with openwork and refined decorations, often adorned with the heraldic crests of the noble families who commissioned them. (Note: To promote himself among Italy's wealthy nobility, Carlo Ginori gifted "crested prototypes" to the most prestigious families he knew or had befriended. This strategy achieved both publicity and significant commissions.)

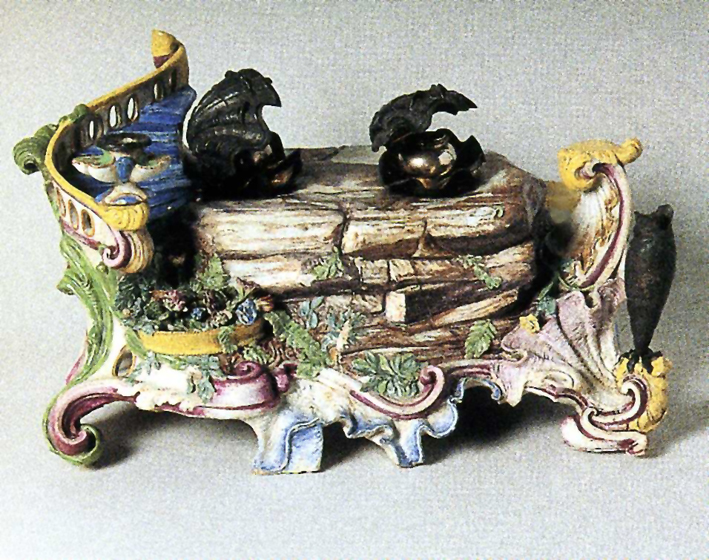
Large inkwell in the shape of garden architecture. Ginori at Doccia, mid-18th century. Gazzada Schianno, Villa Cagnola Museum.

Numerous surviving examples are decorated with the crests of prominent noble families: from Electress Palatine Anna Maria Luisa de' Medici to the Brignole, Gerini, Franceschi, the Genoese Isola Marana, the Capponi, the Gozzadini, Del Vernaccia, Lignani Boccadiferro, Frescobaldi, Castelli, and Pasquali, as well as notable examples with the crests of Cardinals Ludovico Maria Torriggiani and Gianfranco Stoppani.

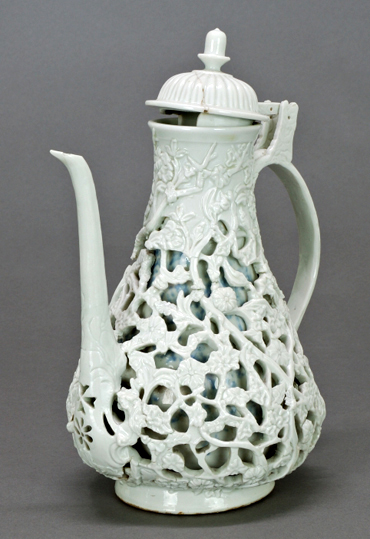
Coffeepot with double wall. Ginori at Doccia, second quarter of the 18th century. International Museum of Ceramics in Faenza.

Even in the realm of snuffboxes, perfume holders, and pommels for swords and walking sticks, the Doccia factory was renowned for its unparalleled excellence. From the outset of production, the factory employed the finest painters to execute the decorations. Documented works include those by Carl Anreiter, Giovan Battista Fanciullacci, Angiolo Fiaschi, Gioacchino Rigacci, and Lorenzo Masini.

The manufactory's focus on this particular production is evidenced by the creation of a "Silversmiths’ Workshop" to refine snuffboxes and perfume holders in precious metal, initially under the direction of the Frenchman Jean-François Racein, followed by the German Johann Georg Komette, and, from 1758, after Carlo Ginori's death, by Michele Taddei, appointed by his son Lorenzo.

The early years were undoubtedly challenging: difficulties in sourcing materials, especially clays, necessitated continuous experimentation, resulting in the manufactory incurring losses rather than profits until Carlo Ginori's death in 1757 in Livorno, where he had been appointed Governor a few years earlier. Despite obtaining the privilege from the Prince of Craon, efforts to increase the workforce and open sales shops for his porcelains—starting with Giuseppe Sarti's shop in Florence between 1742 and 1743, followed by those of Fallani, Montauti, Tondelli, and Raugi, and a retail outlet on Via De Ginori in Florence—did not yield financial success.

Other cities saw the opening of sales points: Lucca (with three shops), Livorno with an important warehouse and workshop, Bologna, Naples, and abroad in Lisbon, Tarragona, Madrid, and Constantinople. Additionally, Marquis Ginori's entrepreneurial spirit led him to attempt, albeit with little success, to penetrate the East Indies market by sending crates of products to test the reception of his porcelains, aiming to compete with the dominant Chinese and Japanese wares imported successfully into Europe for over a century by various East India Companies.

=== Pictorial decorations ===
Below is a list of known decorations (omitting less significant variants) identified in the Inventory of Porcelains and Maiolicas Found on This Day, 25 October 1743, in the Warehouse in the Hands of Giuseppe Sarti, as well as in the 1747 price lists for white and polychrome porcelains and those noted in inventories compiled at Carlo Ginori's death in 1757. Naturally, bespoke productions for noble commissions are excluded. In italics are terms from ancient inventories, while modern designations are in quotation marks:

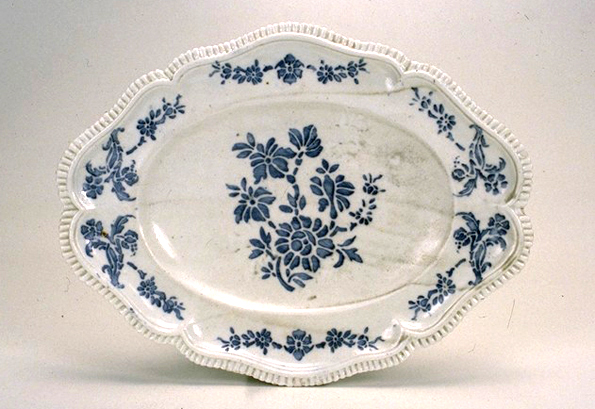
Tray decorated with a “stencil pattern.” Ginori at Doccia, second quarter of the 18th century. International Museum of Ceramics in Faenza.

- Printed, now called "stenciled": the name derives from the execution technique. For the decoration, strictly in blue, paper, lambskin, or thin copper plates were used, with the surface perforated following the lines of a stylized floral design. It was then placed on the biscuit and the voids filled with color. This simple technique, inspired by the white/blue decorations of Medici porcelain from the late 16th century, allowed easy execution by Carlo Ginori's workforce, composed of artisans and farmers from the estate converted to ceramic production. They quickly mastered it, with Bastiano Buonamici, known as "Micio" or "Miccio", active in the factory from 1747 to 1763, among the best executors. One of Doccia's earliest decorations, it enjoyed great success and was replicated into the "19th century in increasingly simplified and schematic forms".
- Transfer: a technique that, from 1750, anticipated the transfer printing developed in England from 1756. Listed in inventories as a printed decoration, it involved a complex sequence to transfer an engraving previously made on copper onto the biscuit, later refined by hand. Rare examples in blue exemplify, with measured elegance, both a taste for landscapes (a known example is a view of Venice derived from prints by Antonio Visentini) and mythological and allegorical themes.
- Children's games: two versions of this decoration are known: a simpler one, in blue underglaze using the transfer technique, also called blue cherubs, and a richer one on yellow or white grounds with gold arabesques. It draws iconographic inspiration from prints by Jacques Stella and enjoyed success, though short-lived, in both the Ginori manufactory (disappearing from the 1757 inventory) and the Viennese Du Paquier manufactory.

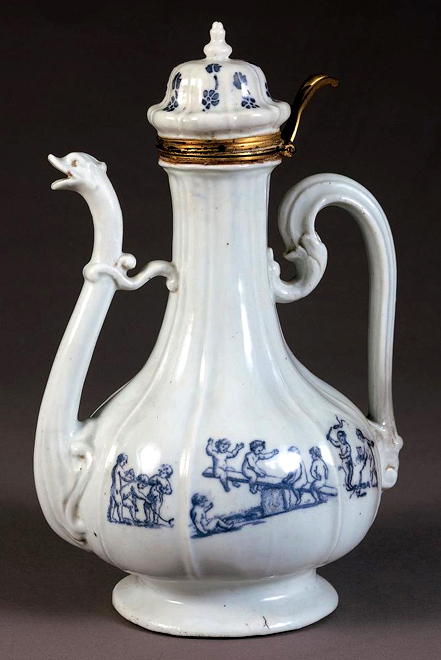
Coffeepot decorated with children's games in blue (transfer technique). Ginori at Doccia, 1745–50. Museo Richard-Ginori della Manifattura di Doccia.

- Red or purple landscapes: the inspiration for this decorative type reflects the popularity of landscape decoration in the second half of the 17th century across Europe. The manufactory's painters drew, among others, on Annibale Carracci and Alessandro Magnasco, the latter well known at the Florentine court as the teacher of Ferdinando de' Medici’s wife. Painted in red on white backgrounds, often within reserves, variants on yellow and apple-green backgrounds (described in inventories as red landscapes and green shirts) are known. In the first period, the main interpreters were Giuseppe Romei and later Carlo Ristori. This decoration was produced at Doccia until the threshold of the 19th century.
- European flowers: present from the earliest years of production, this became a cornerstone of Doccia's decoration. Inspired by the naturalistic paintings of early 17th-century Florence, it drew on the "deutsche blumen: poppies, chrysanthemums, small roses" of contemporary Meissen and Vienna manufactories, with decorations listed in inventories as bouquets and flowers in the German style and two panels on a blue ground with gold arabesques, flowers in the center, and gold borders. Refined interpretations with colored flowers and insects, sometimes within white reserves on blue backgrounds, were also popular, a color much in vogue at the Sèvres manufactory. Other terms for these decorations include: nasturtium and blue with butterfly, butterflies, and painted with insects. The latter draw iconographic inspiration from late 16th-century drawings by Georg Hoefnagel and his son. While not precisely documented in early factory lists, this decoration, recently termed "bouquet" in literature, was highly appreciated until the mid-19th century, though replicated with an increasingly less incisive, almost serial stroke, sensitive to evolving styles.
- Figures all in gold: one of the most refined decorations produced at Doccia in the first period, it finds its precedents in Chinese daily life scenes that stylistically influenced Europe since the mid-17th century. The prototypes for these porcelain decorations are found in the works of the Hausmaler of Augsburg, the brothers Abraham and Bartholomaus Seuter, and the Aufenwerth workshop, who decorated white pieces from Meissen. These likely inspired the delicate decorations of Carl Anreiter, followed, over the decades and at least until 1760, by Doccia's best painters, including Giuseppe Niccheri and Angiolo Fiaschi. Initially produced in gold monochrome, it was soon complemented by delicate arabesque motifs (inspired by arabesques, hence the term in ancient inventories) in red and gold, sometimes polychrome, along with flower bouquets. In its gold and polychrome variants, it is listed in inventories as a decoration with a red arabesque panel and fine Chinese figures, or Saxon style with beautiful gold, or Miniature Saxon style with gold arabesques. Also linked to the vast Eastern-inspired iconographic world is the Chinese palaces decoration, in gold or other colors, which had a short life and finds its origins in Viennese Du Paquier decorations likely drawn from prints by Johan Nieuhof.
- Blue figures and landscapes or blue flowers in the Chinese style: a decoration primarily inspired by Ming and Qing (Kangxi) porcelains successfully imported to the West from the 16th to the 17th century; these porcelains had inspired the Medici at the end of the 16th century to produce so-called "artificial" soft-paste porcelain, well-remembered by Carlo Ginori. The decorative themes, painted strictly in white/blue and often divided into quarters (in the decoration now called "Asian-style blue underglaze floral"), were also influenced by Delftware maiolica, which, imitating Eastern wares, had competed with Chinese porcelains in the European market for over a century. The Doccia decoration of Eastern inspiration was also influenced by stylistic references to Japanese Imari porcelains, imported to Europe since the second half of the 17th century by various East India Companies.

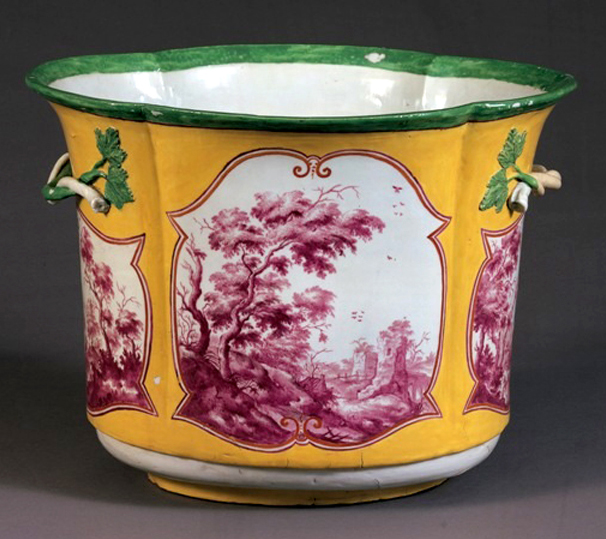
Cooler decorated with red landscapes within reserves on a yellow background. Ginori at Doccia, mid-18th century. Museo Richard-Ginori della Manifattura di Doccia.

- Wild rose or rose or thorny rose: a single curved, leafy raceme with buds and an open rose at the end, painted in deep blue and rarely outlined with scattered polychrome insects. Documented mainly during the early period, there are a few examples in “masso bastardo” dating back to 1760, perhaps made as replacements.
- With flower and leaf reliefs or with flowers in low relief or white with flower and leaf reliefs: a low-relief decoration inspired by blanc de chine from Fujian. It features a plum flower in low relief, sometimes colored in red monochrome, red and gold, or white with gold touches, always on white backgrounds. It is found in coffeepots, teapots, or cups. This decoration is referenced in the Mansi family inventories in Lucca as pieces that are all white with leaf reliefs in the Japanese style. Examples of these pieces have been lost; additionally, Ginori inventories mention an unknown green plum flower decoration.
- "Cut hedge": a decoration derived from the Japanese Kakiemon style with a characteristic soft color palette and subjects of landscapes, stylized dwellings, or simple fences, enriched with small scattered floral racemes and a small phoenix in flight. Unlike its success at Meissen, it was underrepresented at Doccia and short-lived. Among the decorative variants, an exceptional high-quality example with broader coverage is noted, described as a Japanese decoration with ornaments and birds, painted with a treed Eastern garden, a large phoenix in the foreground, and flower branches on the rim, preserved at the Museo Richard-Ginori della Manifattura di Doccia.
- "Table pattern": a decoration modeled on Meissen's Tischchenmuster, used since 1725 in that manufactory. Of Japanese origin with characteristic overglaze gold, iron red, and underglaze blue, it was produced in an almost serial and increasingly schematic manner until 1760.
- With purple or red flowers in the center and small flowers around with some gilding: this designation from inventories likely refers to one of Doccia's most famous decorations, the "Tulip". Begun around 1740, it draws inspiration from both Chinese "famille rose" decorations and contemporary Japanese Imari paintings, widely exported to the West and at the height of their fame. However, it was in the second and third periods that this decoration gained widespread application in products and became, alongside the "flower bouquet", the most popular design produced in the factory. The decoration features a large stylized peony, not a tulip as the name erroneously suggests, painted in iron-red shades with small flowers and leaves branching out.
- Black and gold roosters: this motif was also widely popular, drawing iconographic sources from subjects painted on Chinese Kangxi period porcelains and prints by the 16th-century engraver Giovanni Maria Pomedello. Its appearance at Doccia is noted from 1747 in pieces painted with solitary or fighting roosters on rocky backgrounds in black and gold. Shortly after, around 1750, the rooster theme was painted in blue and gold, blue, red, and gold, red monochrome, or, in rare examples, green. Several painters of this decoration are mentioned in the inventories of the early period: Antonio Carraresi, Francesco Pintucci, and Ferdinando Campostrini. It was produced continuously until the second quarter of the 19th century, but from the late 18th century to around 1820, it was painted almost exclusively in red monochrome.
- Other decorative types, listed in inventories with few surviving examples but noteworthy for their pictorial quality, include: Painted red with sacred histories and countless figures, Japanese style with gold (somewhat popular in the first period), With finely worked fruit, and "With the series of the months of the year", among the most significant.

=== Plastic works ===
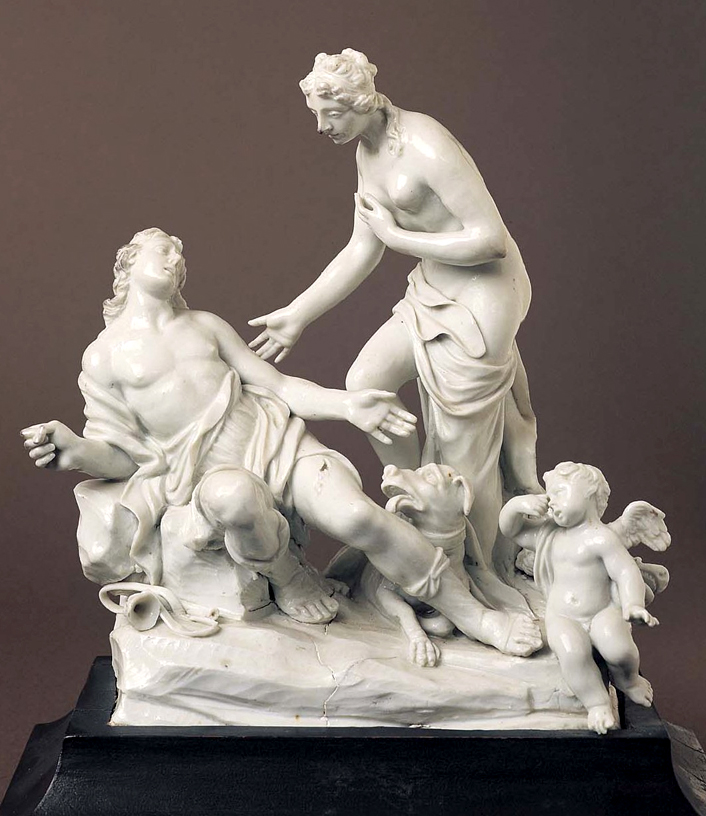
Venus and Adonis, Ginori at Doccia, c. 1750. Museo Richard-Ginori della Manifattura di Doccia.

==== Notable mythological and classical subjects ====
- Gaspero Bruschi, Cupid and Psyche, (1747). Faenza, International Museum of Ceramics in Faenza.
- Gaspero Bruschi, Cupid and Psyche, (1748). Turin, Civic Museum of Ancient Art. (Note: "[...] inventories mention two distinct models of Cupid and Psyche: one derived from Giovan Battista Foggini, with the reference model certainly being the bronze now preserved at the Detroit Institute of Arts, executed in 1748 by his son Vincenzo Foggini, and the other derived from a bronze by Massimiliano Soldani Benzi, now in Berlin. A porcelain version of the latter is known in the collections of the Civic Museum of Ancient Art in Turin [...].")

The forms (Note: Form, in the sense of the shape in which an object is presented.) draw inspiration from three sculptural models: a Hellenistic marble sculpture, a bronze by Massimiliano Soldani Benzi, and one by Foggini. Correspondence from the factory confirms two of the three models: "The Group of Cupid and [P]syche is being assembled and is not turning out badly [...]" and later, "The group of the Goat is now in the kiln, and once fired, the Cupid and Psyche, which is not turning out badly, of the same color and solid, except that the heads are not as close together as the original, but nevertheless acceptable."

Carlo Ginori repeatedly checked with Bruschi on the success of the various models during 1747, and his anticipation is documented in a letter hoping that "Cupid and Psyche will be successful, and that the two that turn out best will be put together [...]".

- Gaspero Bruschi, Venus Removing a Thorn, (1747). Private collection.
- Gaspero Bruschi, Venus de' Medici, (1747). Sesto Fiorentino, Museo Richard-Ginori della Manifattura di Doccia.
- Gaspero Bruschi, Diana and Callisto, (c. 1750). Florence, Stibbert Museum.
- Laocoön, (c. 1750). Milan, Museo Poldi Pezzoli.

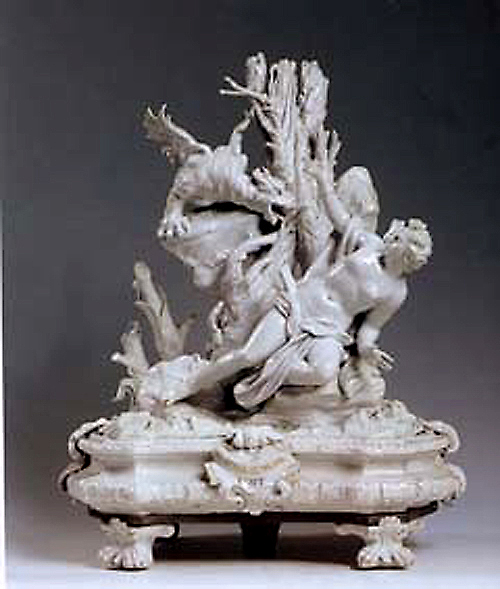
Group of Andromeda and the Sea Monster. Ginori at Doccia, c. 1750. Florence, Stibbert Museum.

It likely draws its iconographic source from a bronze by Giovanni Francesco Susini and follows a wax model by Vincenzo Foggini, as noted in an 18th-century inventory: "[...] Group of the Laocoön. (Note: As written in the text.) By Foggini with molds. 24 pieces." (Note: "The Laocoön, now preserved at the Poldi Pezzoli Museum in Milan, may have its source in a bronze by Susini or a classical original, and is derived from a wax by Vincenzo Foggini executed in June 1748; [...].")

- Venus and Adonis, (c. 1750). Sesto Fiorentino, Museo Richard-Ginori della Manifattura di Doccia.

It takes its form from a model by Massimiliano Soldani Benzi, as stated in the inventory: "No. 36 Adonis and Venus. By Massimiliano Soldani in wax with mold."

- Mercury and Argus, (c. 1750). Private collection.
- Perseus and Medusa, (c. 1750). London, Trinity Fine Art.
- Hippomenes, (c. 1750). Formerly antiquarian market.
- The Three Fates, (c. 1750–1755). Formerly Lapicirella collection.
- Andromeda and the Sea Monster, (c. 1750). Florence, Stibbert Museum.

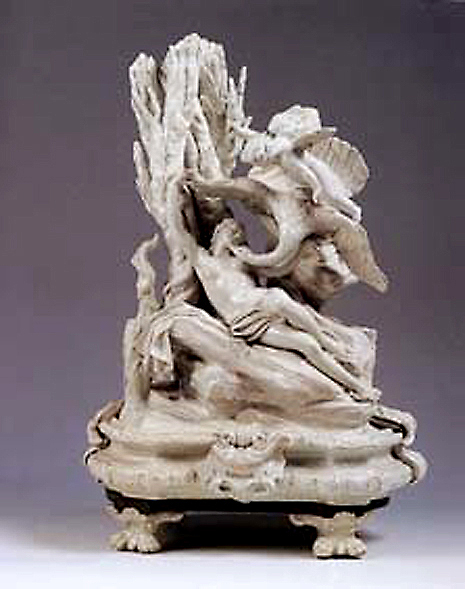
Group of Leda with the Swan. Ginori at Doccia, c. 1750. Florence, Stibbert Museum.

Of note is the white porcelain group in the Stibbert Museum's collection. It rests on a base with lion's paw feet and bears a cartouche inscribed "MATRIS SUPERBI LUIT"; it is listed "among the models, in the Fourth Room and cited as group representing Andromeda devoured by the sea monster, in wax. By Soldani [Benzi] with mold [...]."

- Leda with the Swan, (c. 1750). Florence, Stibbert Museum.

Multiple versions of this subject were replicated in the first period, with the most significant preserved at the Stibbert Museum. The group of Leda with the Swan was created as a pair with Andromeda and the Sea Monster, sharing the same cartouche base style, inscribed in this case with "RTIUM MEDITATUR AMOREM JUPPITER". "The model is found in the Third Room at No. 1 Group of Leda with trees, swan, and a kneeling cherub above said Swan in wax with molds. By Soldani [Benzi] [...]." Two other versions are also known, one of which is smaller. For the larger ones, both waxes and bronzes by Soldani Benzi are preserved in museums. For the smaller one, Doccia artists drew inspiration from a work by Luca della Robbia.

- The Judgment of Paris, (c. 1750). Gazzada Schianno, Villa Cagnola Museum.

"[...] two important sculptural groups, both representing this myth and derived from a model by Soldani Benzi [...]" are one at the Sforza Castle Museum in Milan, the other at the Villa Cagnola Museum in Gazzada Schianno. Notably, an inventory erroneously attributes the model to Girolamo Ticciati.

==== Religious subjects from the Old and New Testaments ====
- Gaspero Bruschi, Pietà, (1745). Los Angeles County Museum of Art.

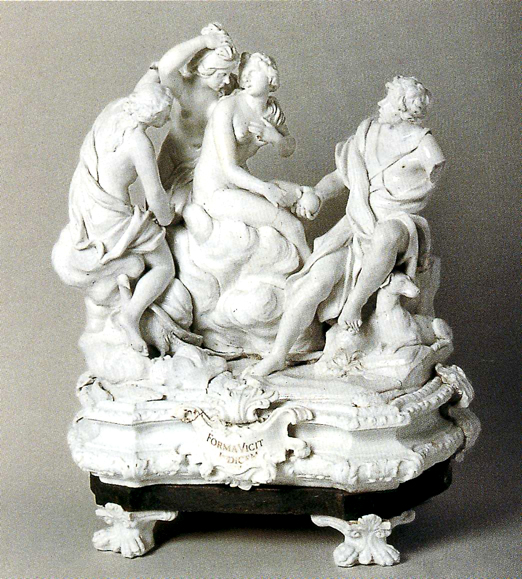
The Judgment of Paris, Ginori at Doccia, mid-18th century. Villa Cagnola Museum.

Two polychrome versions and one white version of this celebrated work are known. The polychrome versions are preserved at the Los Angeles County Museum of Art and the Nationalmuseum in Stockholm. The white version is in the Corsini collection. These groups are referenced in a document from 1744:

[...] regarding the Pietà, the base has been made in rowan wood, framed, and the platform with the Sepulchre has been assembled, except for the figures, as the Mount Calvary has also been assembled and attached, which I will deliver to Mr. Bruschi to make the necessary pieces (Note: In July 1744, Massimiliano’s son, Ferdinando Soldani Benzi, received a substantial payment for the price of a mold of a group representing a Pietà. This likely refers to the mold for a significant group, of which three porcelain examples are known today: one owned by the Corsini princes in white and two polychrome versions, one preserved at the Los Angeles County Museum of Art and the other at the Nationalmuseum in Stockholm.)

- David and Goliath, (c. 1750). Sesto Fiorentino, Museo Richard-Ginori della Manifattura di Doccia.
- Judith Beheading Holofernes, (c. 1750). London, Trinity Fine Art. (Note: "The group of the Sacrifice of Abraham is derived from the bronze executed for Electress Palatine Anna Maria Luisa de' Medici by Giuseppe Piamontini in 1722, which Jennifer Montagu identified as the prototype for the porcelain; it was the second of four sacred bronzes themed on events from the Old Testament: the others were The Sacrifice of Jephthah's Daughter, Judith Beheading Holofernes, and David with the Head of Goliath.")
- The Samaritan Woman at the Well, (c. 1750). Private collection. (Note: "No. 5. Group of the Samaritan Woman with Jesus Christ at the Well. By Ticciati. In wax with mold.")
- Mary Magdalene Kissing the Feet of Jesus Christ, (c. 1755). Milan, Sforza Castle Museums. (Note: "The Magdalene group is listed among the models in the third room as Group of the Magdalene, kissing the feet of Jesus Christ with the Pharisee standing. By Soldani [Benzi] in wax with mold, [...].")
- Saint Benedict in the Cave, (c. 1755). Private collection. (Note: The plastic works with Saint Benedict as a subject correspond to a wax by Soldani Benzi preserved at the Doccia Museum.)

==== Other subjects ====
- Gaspero Bruschi, Machine for the Etruscan Academy of Cortona, (1750–1751), Cortona, Museum of the Etruscan Academy and the City of Cortona, property of the Etruscan Academy.
- Gaspero Bruschi (with subsequent interventions by Giuseppe Ettel), Fireplace, (1754), Sesto Fiorentino, Museo Richard-Ginori della Manifattura di Doccia.

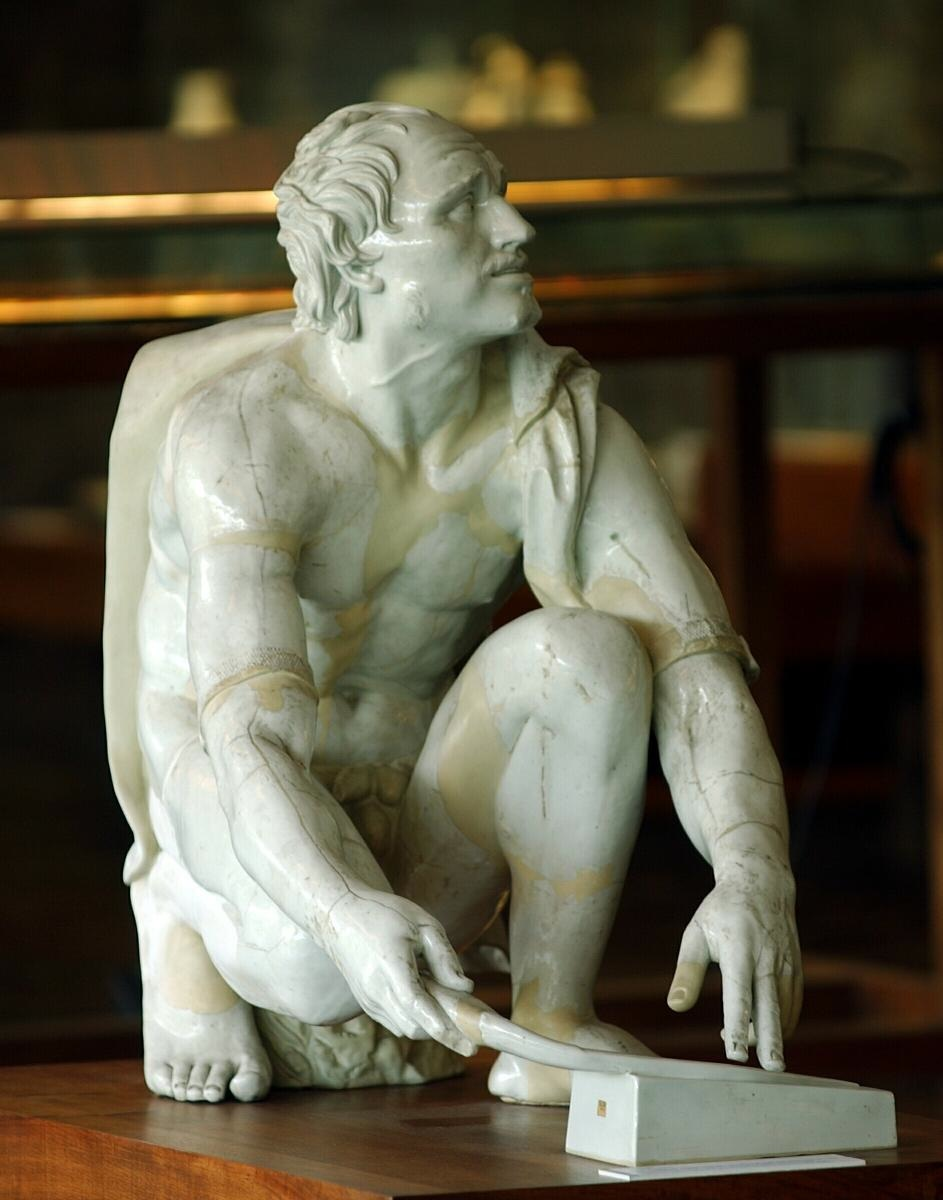
Gaspero Bruschi, Knife Grinder. Ginori at Doccia, (1745?). Museo Richard-Ginori della Manifattura di Doccia.

- Gaspero Bruschi, Knife Grinder, (1745?). Sesto Fiorentino, Museo Richard-Ginori della Manifattura di Doccia.

We have heard the Senator's intention to attach the supports to the Knife Grinder statue. First, when a piece of this size is removed from the kiln, it is difficult to handle and must be cut into pieces immediately. Then, due to its size, it becomes thin and fragile, and we can no longer handle it. In this case, it seems to me that the supports would be placed randomly, without knowing where to place them in easily accessible places, such as the arms, as I am doing. Once dry, it becomes difficult to attach them well [...]; if a piece warps once fired, it will be difficult to fix [...] . In short, this must be done before cutting it into pieces, while it is still fresh and whole, so one can see what is being done. This seems to me to be the most judicious and reflective approach.

— From a letter by Gaspero Bruschi to Jacopo Rendelli in 1745, (Note: In this letter, Bruschi expresses technical concerns about Marquis Ginori’s orders for creating a sculpture of such large dimensions (almost life-sized).)

- Portrait of Empress Maria Theresa of Austria, bas-relief, (c. 1744). Sesto Fiorentino, Museo Richard-Ginori della Manifattura di Doccia.

==== Bas-reliefs, cameos, and sartù ====
The production of historiated bas-reliefs deserves mention, with the most notable, including the previously mentioned "Four Seasons", finding counterparts in the "Four Seasons" produced by Soldani Benzi (Note: The four bronzes are currently preserved at the Bayerisches Nationalmuseum in Munich, while the terracotta models are at the Museum of Silver in Palazzo Pitti, Florence, and the waxes at the Doccia Porcelain Museum.) between 1708 and 1711, commissioned by Ferdinando de' Medici, as well as in the works of Giovan Battista Foggini and archival sources.

The bas-reliefs at Doccia were primarily created by Weber, with Girolamo Cristofani distinguished for plaster models.

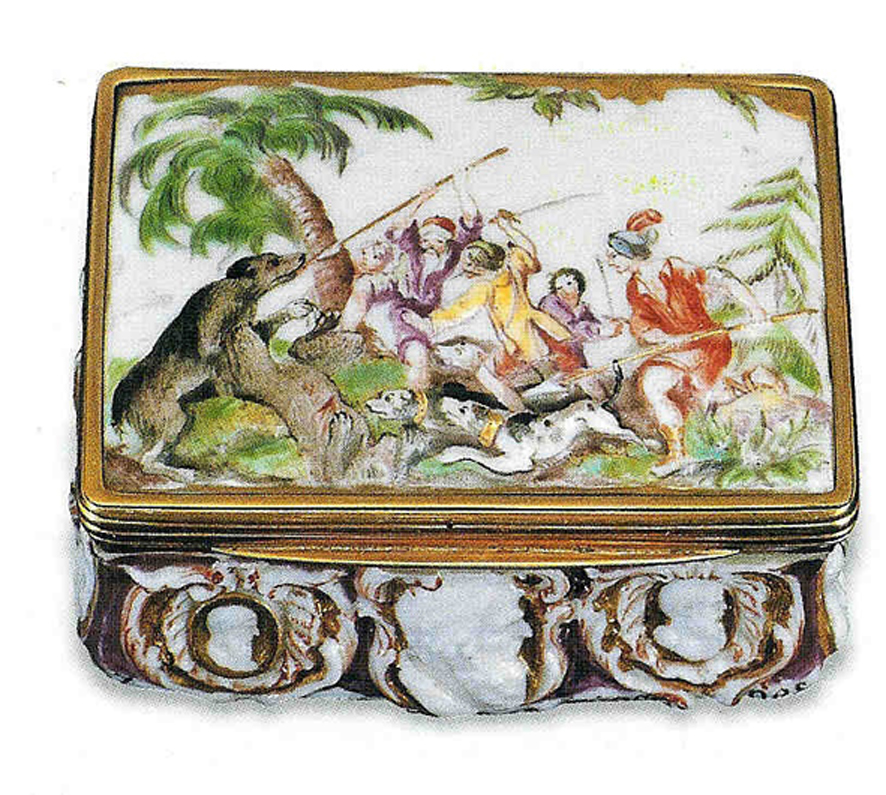
Snuffbox painted with a bear hunting scene. Front decorated with cameos. Ginori at Doccia, (c. 1750). Museo Richard-Ginori della Manifattura di Doccia.

The bas-reliefs produced by the Ginori manufactory, which were previously incorrectly attributed to the Capodimonte factory, encompass a wide range of subjects: The Judgment of Paris, Pluto Abducting Proserpina, The Triumph of Galatea, Silenus on the Donkey, The Shooting of the Niobids, The Chariot of Ceres, Hermaphrodite and the Nymph Salmacis, Liriope and Narcissus, The Fall of the Giants, Marsyas Flayed by Apollo, The Triumph of Bacchus, Neptune with Sea Horses, Phaeton on the Sun's Chariot, The Hunt of Meleager, The Banquet of the Gods.

Among celebratory subjects, "a special place is reserved for the portraits of Empress Maria Theresa and her husband Francis Stephen", with examples known in white and polychrome porcelain. (Note: "[...] the first reference to their production dates to 1744 when the Venetian merchant Marco Zuana, on 22 August 1744, wrote to Marquis Ginori: I have heard with satisfaction that the aforementioned portrait of the Queen arrived without damage, and that you found it to your satisfaction. The portrait reached Vienna, and numerous traces of this gift are found in the correspondence between Carlo Ginori and Baron Charles von Pfutschner; [...]." A portrait of Maria Theresa is currently preserved at the Museo Richard-Ginori della Manifattura di Doccia.)

In cameos, with modeling similar to bas-reliefs, Doccia's artisans achieved excellent results, as seen in those created for the "Machine for the Etruscan Academy of Cortona", (Note: "This work includes a medal depicting Maria Theresa of Austria and Francis Stephen of Lorraine together, and seventy-three from the so-called Medici series, executed in bronze by Antonio Francesco Selvi from 1739 onward [...] all medals on a blue background [...].") the vase with medals depicting the Duchesses of Lorraine, the plaques with representations of the Caesars and philosophers of classical antiquity, and in snuffboxes and double-walled objects with cameo reliefs in their forms.

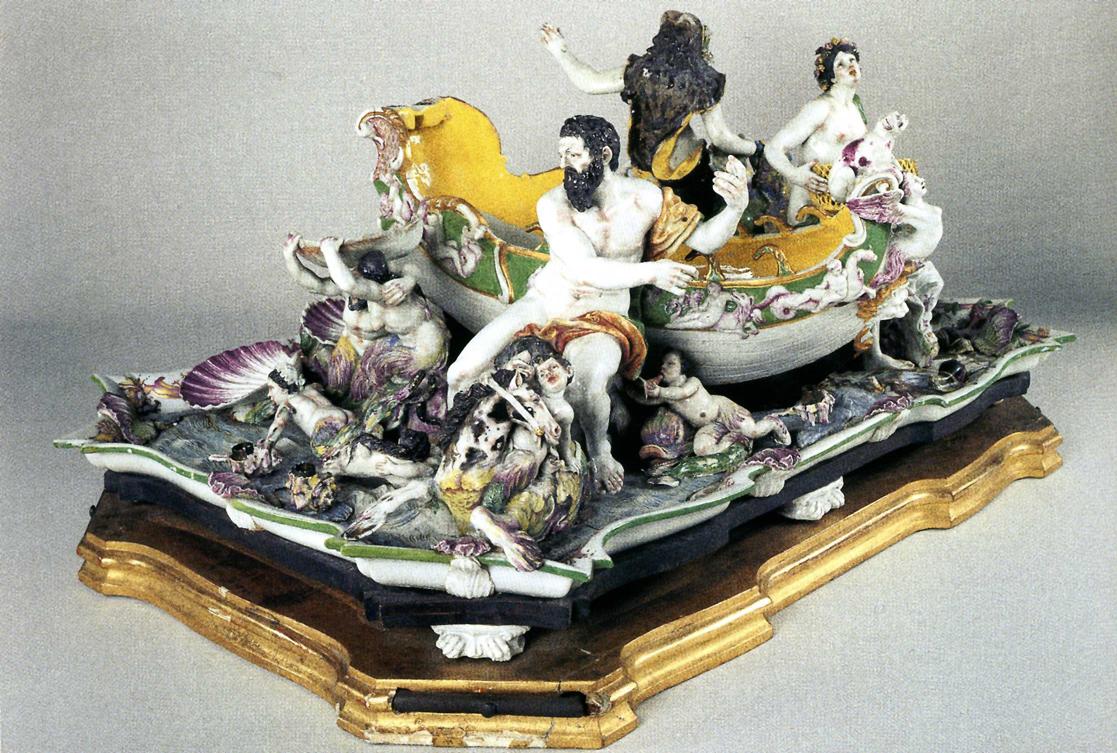
Sartù in the form of a ship at shore. Ginori at Doccia, mid-18th century. Gazzada Schianno, Villa Cagnola Museum.

The cameos and bas-reliefs were not only produced in white porcelain, and for prestigious commissions, the finest painters, including Giuseppe Romei (from 1742 to 1752), were employed, though refined polychrome interpretations signed by Carl Wendelin Anreiter, the best painter at Doccia in the first period, are also known. (Note: "[...] four high-quality polychrome plaques are known today, one of which, depicting the scene of the shooting of Niobe's daughters, bears the signature of the Head of Painters Carl Wendelin Anreiter." The plaque, datable to c. 1745, is preserved at Trinity Fine Art in London.)

Last but certainly not least are the elaborate Triumphs, often polychrome, produced by Doccia's artisans. These triumphs further enriched lavish table settings and rivaled those produced by the Meissen, Vienna, and Sèvres manufactories.

The production of these composite pieces required such significant resources that the Ginori manufactory gradually phased them out of its catalogs after 1760. They are divided into "Deser" or "Deserre", "Sartù" (Note: Sartù: [...] A type of Triumph placed in the center of grand tables where salt cellars, sugar bowls, etc., are set.) or, in smaller forms, "Digiuné", often composed of numerous pieces. Notable subjects include: "Sartù in the form of a ship at shore, [...] with architecture with railings, tower, bridges, columns, fauns, vases, statuettes, small baskets, Sartù representing a rustic architecture with a crystal platform, four figurines and nine small vases, Deserre representing fables composed of three pieces with pergolas [...] flowers and other additions to the vines [...], Deserre representing the lighthouse of Egypt with figures and flowers, Deserre representing a Parterre (Note: From French Parterre: "A delightful place with flowerbeds and compartments adorned with herbs and flowers.") with figures and groups".

== The second period: Lorenzo Ginori ==
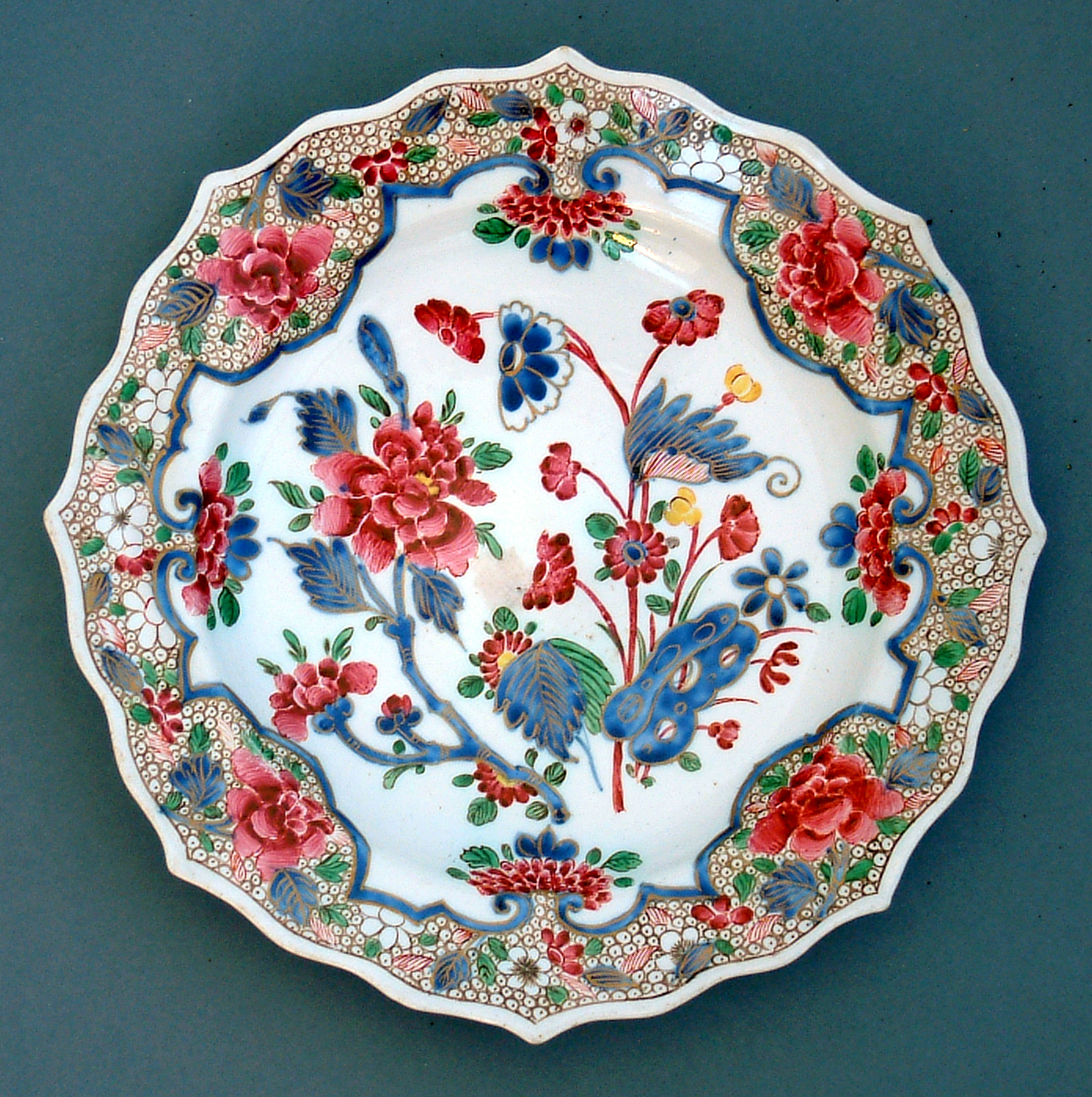
Plate with floral decoration inspired by the carnation in an Eastern style. Ginori at Doccia, third quarter of the 18th century.

Following the death of Carlo Ginori in 1757, his son Lorenzo, overcoming some succession disputes with his brothers Bartolomeo and Giuseppe and thanks to an increasingly large and diversified production, enabled the Ginori manufactory to strengthen and lay the foundations for its future success.

Lorenzo Ginori's approach to the workforce lacked the paternal involvement of his father. As Biancalana notes, Lorenzo does not appear "directly involved in production processes, nor does he face the daily challenges of the work", as Carlo, a chemist of the factory himself, had done, beyond being its owner and founder.

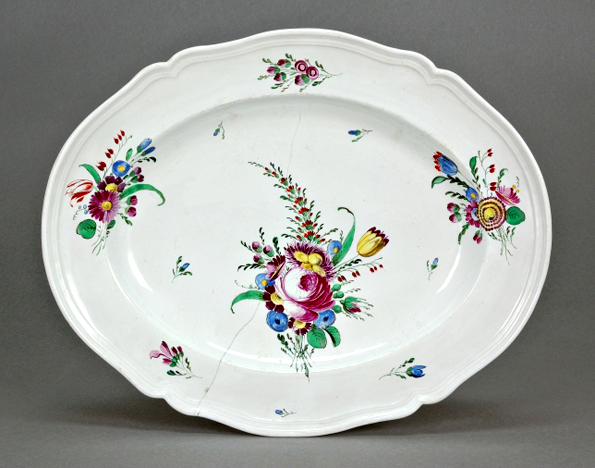
Tray decorated with flower bouquets. Ginori at Doccia, third quarter of the 18th century. International Museum of Ceramics in Faenza.

However, Lorenzo focused on introducing and encouraging technological experiments and innovations, notably the systematic adoption from 1761 of a composition that, starting from a hard-paste biscuit made with low-cost components and a soft glaze typical of maiolica, allowed aesthetically pleasing results at a reduced cost: this was later defined in 1779 as the "masso bastardo".

Previously, during Carlo's time, a "bastard porcelain" was mentioned, but these were distinctly different compositions. The Ginori manufactory used the "masso bastardo" for many years until kaolin imported from France gradually replaced all others, a process fully completed only in the first quarter of the 19th century.

In the second period, the decorative families inherited from the first continued, though the expressive strength of the late Baroque style waned, while the ductus (Note: Pictorial stroke, pictorial expression.) aligned with graceful elegance to the demands of the Rococo style, though, as Andreina d’Agliano notes, the influence of the Rocaille style at Doccia was short-lived, and "by around 1770, decorative motifs anticipating the neoclassical style were introduced".

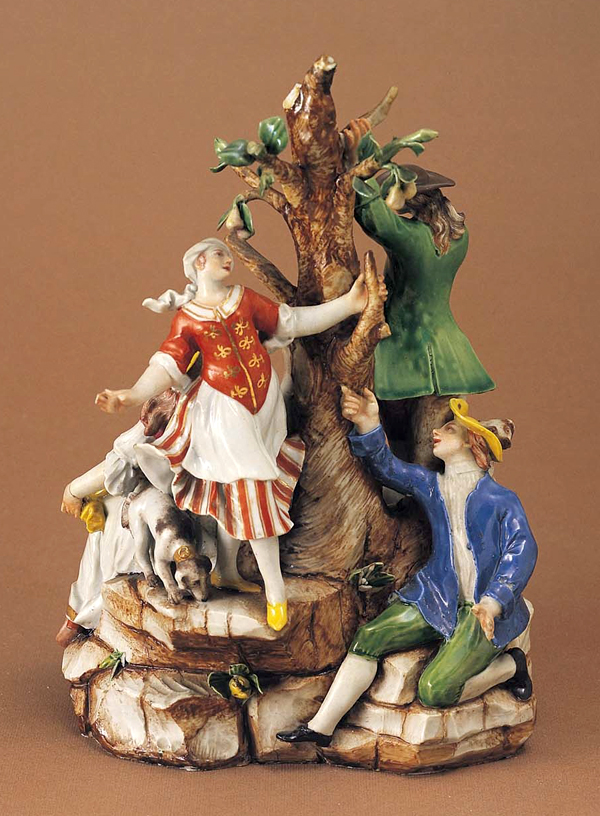
The Pear Harvest, polychrome porcelain group. Ginori at Doccia, last quarter of the 18th century. Museo Richard-Ginori della Manifattura di Doccia.

Popular decorations included the "flower bouquets" (the so-called "mazzetto", an evolution of the "ciocchetti"), the "Saxon" motif, the "rooster" now painted in blue/gold and later exclusively in red/gold, red landscapes, and various Eastern-inspired subjects, among others; the "stenciled" production continued with more subdued colors, and the "tulip" decoration with less painted backgrounds.

Lorenzo's period did not bring significant changes to sculptural production, except for a slow and progressive decline, barely affected by Rococo influences, while tableware saw a stylistic alignment with prevailing trends.

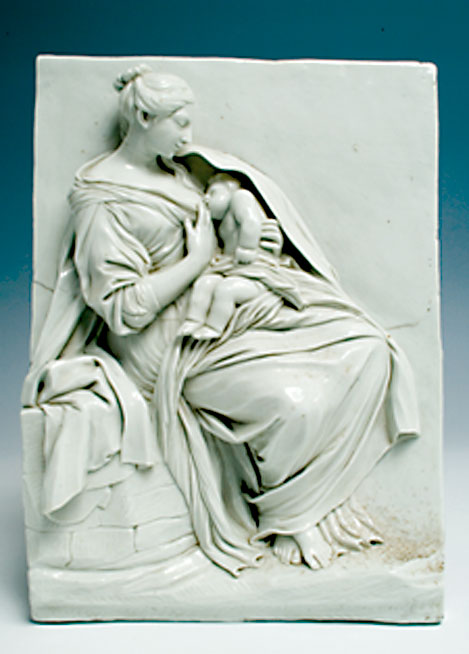
Seated Mary Nursing the Child Jesus. High relief, Ginori at Doccia, c. 1780. Museo Richard-Ginori della Manifattura di Doccia.

Thanks to the great skills of Gaspero Bruschi's nephew, Giuseppe, and later the chief sculptor Giuseppe Ettel, who succeeded him in 1780 upon Gaspero's death, the plastic works fully transitioned to the Rococo style, which, though never as dominant as in other contemporary European and Italian manufactories, culminated in the last quarter of the 18th century with significant allegorical, Eastern, and pastoral groups, such as The Pear Harvest, possibly by Giuseppe Bruschi, as a notable example.

Large-scale and highly demanding works were created in the second period of the Ginori manufactory, including those attributed to Giuseppe Ettel, such as the altar of the San Romolo Church in Colonnata and that of the Santa Maria and San Jacopo Church in Querceto.

The production of bas-reliefs also continued, as can be seen from the Maternity reproduced alongside, the wax model of which is preserved in the Richard-Ginori Museum of the Doccia Manufactory. By 1780, Neoclassicism was already establishing itself

Shortly before his death, Lorenzo Ginori managed to establish a definitive structure for the future management of his factory, prompted by the family disputes with his brothers that marked the early years of the manufactory's management after Carlo's death.

On 10 February 1792, he obtained from the Grand Duke of Tuscany a "Primogenital Agnatic Fideicommissum, despite the prohibitions in the current laws", which exceptionally assigned the factory in perpetuity to the family's firstborn.

With this act, he ensured a smooth succession for the family manufactory, allowing it to focus exclusively on production strategies, directing all available resources to this end.

== The third period: Carlo Leopoldo Ginori Lisci ==
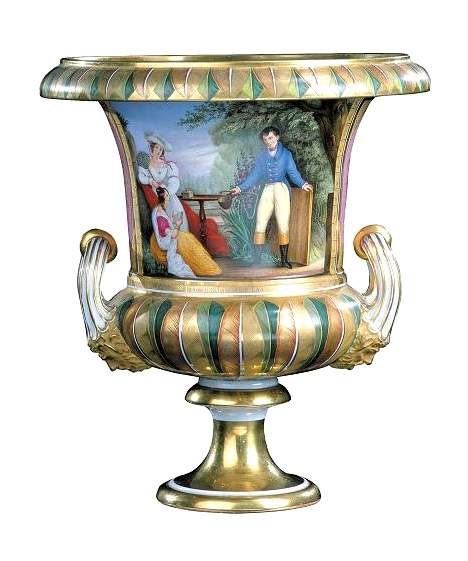
Vase "in the krater form" (Note: So named for its shape derived from Hellenistic kraters.) depicting a departure for the hunt. Ginori at Doccia, first quarter of the 19th century. Museo Richard-Ginori della Manifattura di Doccia.

Upon Lorenzo Ginori's death in 1791, the manufactory lacked a direct successor, as Lorenzo's firstborn, Carlo Leopoldo Ginori Lisci, was only one year old. "Thus, the administration of the family factory fell to Carlo Leopoldo's mother, Francesca Lisci, until her son reached maturity."

The child's guardian was his uncle Giuseppe Ginori, despite strained relations with Lorenzo Ginori; Giuseppe, alongside Francesca Lisci, played a decisive role in the management and organization of the manufactory.

The period of guardianship and Carlo Leopoldo's direct management were marked by different approaches to running the factory: the former maintained artistic continuity with the previous period, while Carlo Leopoldo's maturity saw a growing influence of the Fanciullacci family in management decisions, sometimes barely restrained by Carlo Leopoldo Ginori Lisci's strong personality.

Andreina d’Agliano and Luca Melegati identify in Carlo Leopoldo Ginori Lisci's period (1792–1837) a significant influence of the Empire style, a logical consequence of "Tuscany's political events, entering the Napoleonic orbit at the start of the 19th century, first with the Kingdom of Etruria and later with the direct administration of Elisa Baciocchi, Grand Duchess of Tuscany from 1809 to 1814, which led Ginori to maintain close commercial ties with France".

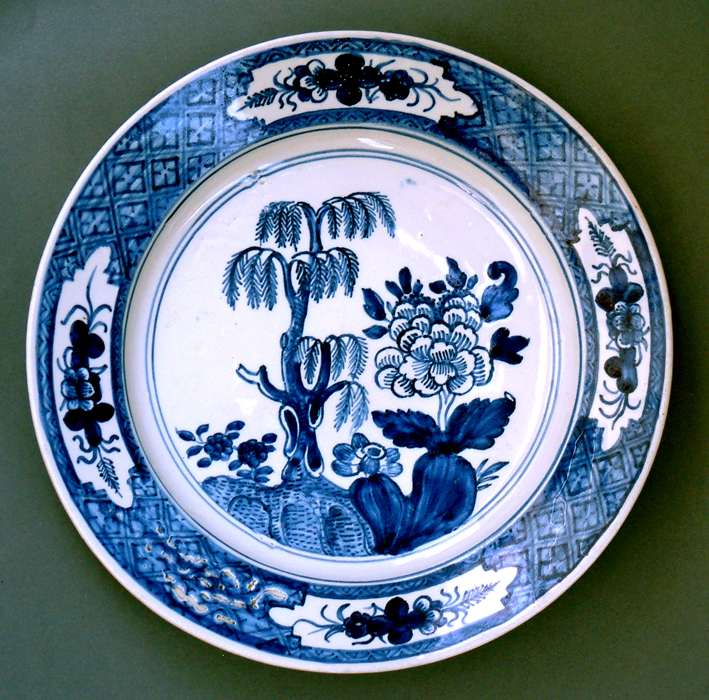
Plate with Eastern-inspired white and blue decoration. Ginori at Doccia, late 18th century.

Astutely, he secured an appointment as chamberlain to Napoleon I, which facilitated frequent interactions with Alexandre Brongniart, director of the Royal Sèvres Manufactory, a man of considerable expertise in material selection, chemical composition, and firing techniques. To further his knowledge, Carlo Leopoldo traveled to England, Germany, and Austria.

This impacted the manufactory's production mechanisms with significant technological innovations: from the introduction of the French-style kiln in 1806 "[...] which allowed, compared to the rectangular ones [previously used], better heat distribution", to the Italian-style circular four-level kiln, 12 meters high, between 1816 and 1818, and the use of clays from Saint Yrieix in France, which gradually replaced those from Tretto and Montecarlo.

As a result, the masso bastardo also declined in use, with the prevalent adoption of French-style paste, using the same clays and chemical composition as the Sèvres manufactory.

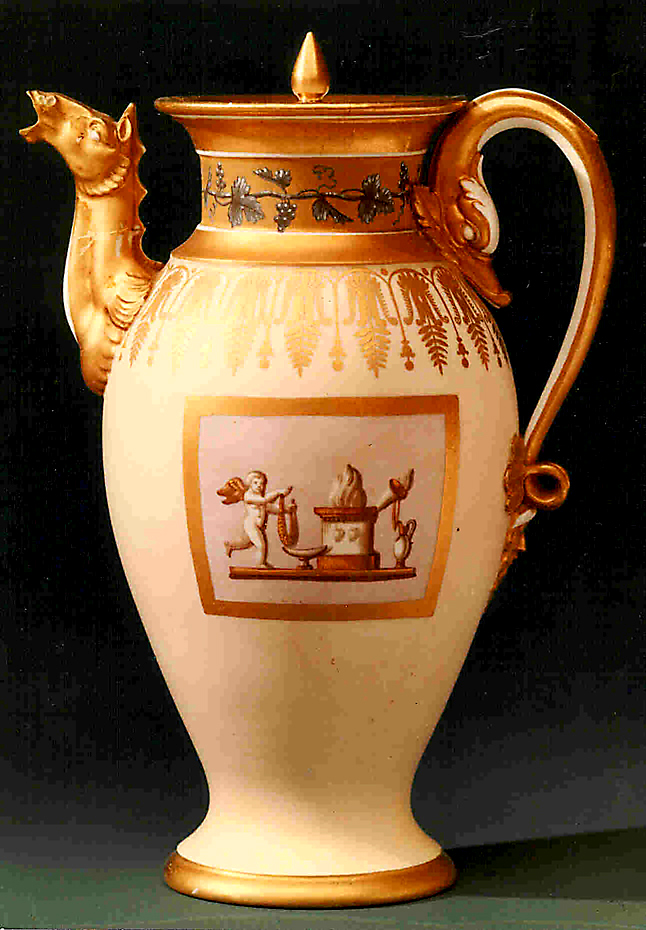
Chocolate pot painted with decorations and a scene, within a frame, of classical inspiration. Ginori at Doccia, first quarter of the 19th century. Museo Richard-Ginori della Manifattura di Doccia.

In line with the materials, the forms and decorations of this period reflect a progressive adoption of French models typical of the First Empire, and to expand their range, in 1821, Carlo Leopoldo, closely tied to Naples like his father, (Note: From a young age, he had traveled to Naples accompanied by Fanciullacci, visiting the Poulard Prad, Giustiniani, and Migliuolo brothers’ factories.) acquired the models of Capodimonte and the Royal Ferdinandea Factory, with the right to reproduce its mark (the crowned N).

Overall, the Ginori manufactory's strategic choices proved successful, shielding the Doccia factory from the repercussions of the Napoleonic Wars that marked the early 19th century, positioning it as a well-structured and financially robust entity in the industrial market of the second quarter of the 19th century.

Among pictorial decorations, the "views" theme gained prominence, introduced by the Florentine Ferdinando Ammannati, an esteemed painter of views from the Royal Ferdinandea Factory, who joined Doccia in 1809. Ammannati worked successfully at Doccia until 1823, bringing his Naples-acquired experience and the refined neoclassical style of the Bourbon capital.

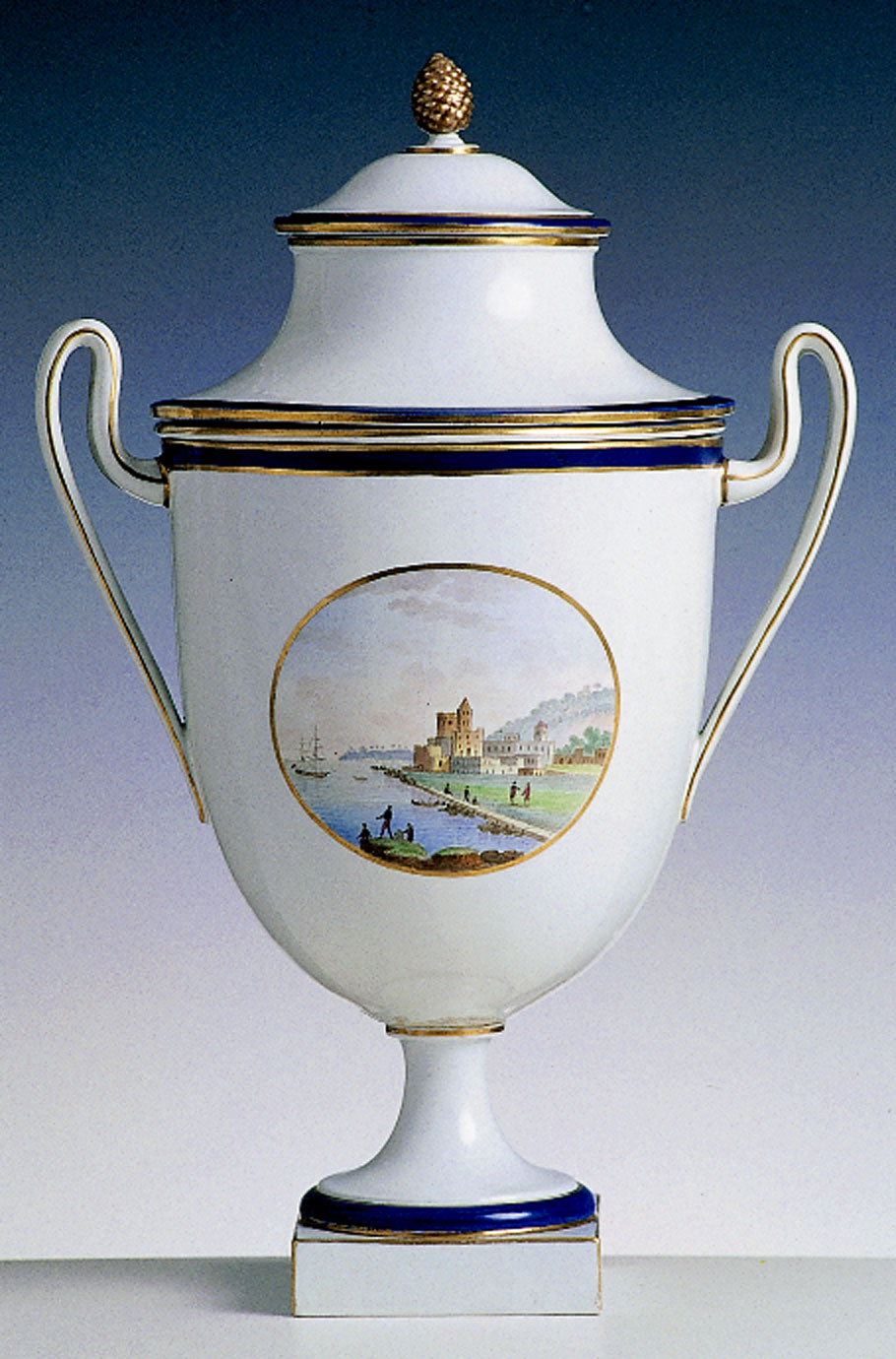
Ice cream cooler in porcelain painted with a coastal view. Ginori at Doccia, first quarter of the 19th century. Museo Richard-Ginori della Manifattura di Doccia.

The subjects depicted included Roman ruins, classical architecture, monuments of Magna Graecia, and mythological scenes, drawing on the extensive iconographic corpus related to archaeological sites, with artifacts uncovered in the second half of the 18th century at Pompeii, Herculaneum, and Stabiae. These were disseminated through renowned printed works, with a pivotal role played by Johann Joachim Winckelmann, and contributions from the most celebrated engravers of the time: Raffaello Morghen, Paolantonio Paoli, and Giovanni Volpato.

These representations were complemented by coastal views of Campania, Naples, Rome, and scenes of squares, palaces, and monuments in the cities and territories of Tuscany.

The neoclassical portraiture genre held a certain prominence, while in the third period, the production of tableware sets decorated with "tulip" and "bouquet" patterns continued, albeit with a now standardized quality.

No inventories exist from the early years of Carlo Leopoldo Ginori's management; the first is from the "firings" of 1812, which clearly indicates the adoption, for the various types of decorative borders surrounding the main motifs, of characteristics typical of the Empire style: "gratings," "meanders," and "bands," encompassing various decorative elements under these terms.

Distinctive plastic applications, such as mascarons, winged and leonine sphinxes, horse-shaped forms, geese, eagles, snakes, dolphins, and harpies, among many others, complete the stylistic range of the painted subjects, which are part of the classical repertoire and beyond.

This is confirmed in the inventory: "Etruscan vase painted with a gold meander in low relief, veiled, with pearl festoons and burnished and veiled swans, with a fully gilded base and lid." [...] "Small bowls and saucers painted with a black cartouche, containing bucchero figures, gold meander, and gold rims, [...] Charon's boat in chiaroscuro, [...] small plate with a French motet and warrior hieroglyphs, [...] burnished eagles in sgraffito, [...] with a portrait of Napoleon [...] small plate with a miniature portrait of the Grand Duchess" and many others in the same iconographic vein.

Other artists arrived at Doccia in the early years of the 19th century: the Frenchman Giovanni David, the Genevan François Joseph de Germain, and the miniaturist Abraham Constantin, who came from the Sèvres manufactory and was a mentor to Giovanni Crisostomo Fanciullacci, son of Giovan Battista, already among the finest painters and a director of the Ginori factory.

Plastic productions slowed significantly during Carlo Leopoldo's period, only partially offset by the introduction of biscuit, which, while already in use at the Neapolitan Bourbon factory, had not been successful at Doccia under Lorenzo Ginori.

Doccia's biscuit production focused on statuettes and groups modeled after those of the Royal Ferdinandea Factory, primarily drawing from the archaeological repertoire. In the biscuit production, always of high technical quality, refined cups featuring the portrait of Elisa Baciocchi, sister of Napoleon, stand out.

== Mid-19th century ==
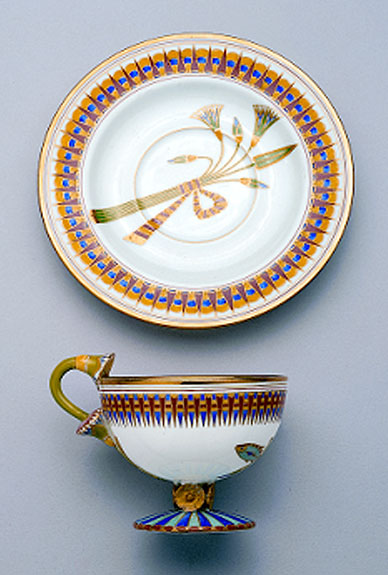
Cup with saucer from the service for the Khedive of Egypt. Ginori at Doccia, c. 1874. Richard-Ginori Museum of the Doccia Manufactory.

Even after Carlo Leopoldo's death in 1837, his successor, Marquis Lorenzo, had not yet reached the age of majority. Consequently, his widow, Marianna Garzoni Venturi, took over the factory's administration with the assistance of Marquis Pierfrancesco Rinuccini.

Once the guardianship period ended and he assumed direct responsibility in 1847, Lorenzo II Ginori introduced significant changes both in the management of the manufactory and in the acquisition of materials, enabling a considerable reduction in production costs.

In the factory's management, the definitive departure of the Fanciullacci family is noted, and for technical innovations, the research of the chemist Giusto Giusti, a close collaborator of Marquis Lorenzo, proved fundamental. Giusti replaced the costly clays from Limoges with those from Cornwall, England, at more affordable prices.

Leonardo Ginori Lisci writes: "In these years, the manufactory continued its active life, but without notable innovations. The only event of some significance was Doccia's participation in Tuscan exhibitions," earning a gold medal at the National Exhibition in Florence in 1861.

More intense efforts were made to penetrate intercontinental markets, with notable success at exhibitions such as those in New York in 1853, Sydney in 1859, Melbourne in 1881, and Rio de Janeiro in 1884.

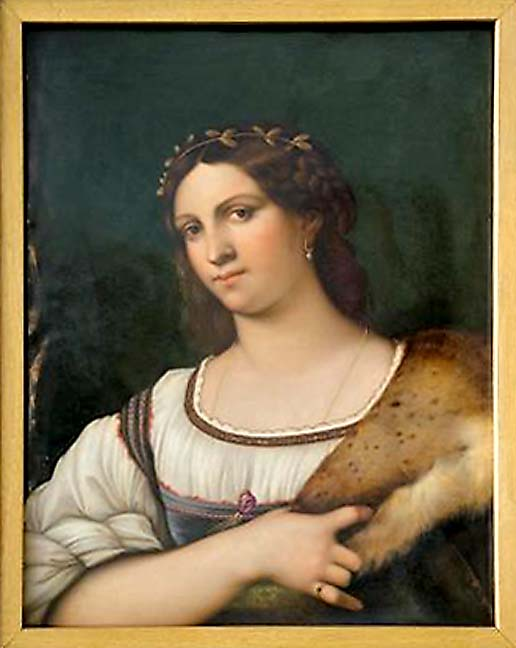
Porcelain plaque reproducing a painting by Sebastiano del Piombo. Ginori at Doccia, second quarter of the 19th century. Richard-Ginori Museum of the Doccia Manufactory.

During this period, particular importance was given to the Medici Vase, (Note: Reproduction of the neo-Attic krater vase, decorated with the theme of the "Triumph of the Sun," preserved since the Renaissance first at the Villa Medici in Rome and later transferred to Florence.) which achieved significant success at the London exhibition of 1862, as well as the typology of large jar-shaped vases and trumpet-shaped vases with characteristic Oriental decoration, highly appreciated at international exhibitions.

The mid-19th century is marked by a definitive technical evolution based on the manufacturing processes of the Sèvres manufactory, achieving a "[...] gradual refinement of porcelain, which is now entirely 'in the French style' [...]. The commercial aspect was also more carefully managed, with continuous participation in various exhibitions providing the clearest confirmation."

At the same time, earthenware with blue decoration made its debut, while the success of artistic majolica began, reinterpreting the great iconographic tradition of the Renaissance, Mannerism, and Baroque.

Alongside the rediscovery of the golden centuries of majolica, the 19th-century Naturalism movement found expression in majolica, with the painter Giuseppe Benassai, who created works of considerable size and collaborated briefly with the manufactory.

By the 1880s, the rapid decline of the Eclecticism era became evident, and the factory's artisans increasingly felt the influence—never fully dormant—arriving anew from the Far East, with decorations inspired by Chinese and Japanese porcelain, revitalizing ceramic art with fresh vitality and moving beyond the composite 19th-century Eclecticism. Thus, at both the Sèvres manufactory and Doccia, delicate floral decorations characterized by an almost calligraphic ductus reappeared.

Significant growth occurred in production during the last quarter of the century, with the workforce nearing 1,500 workers, while diversification into the electrical and chemical sectors also proved successful.

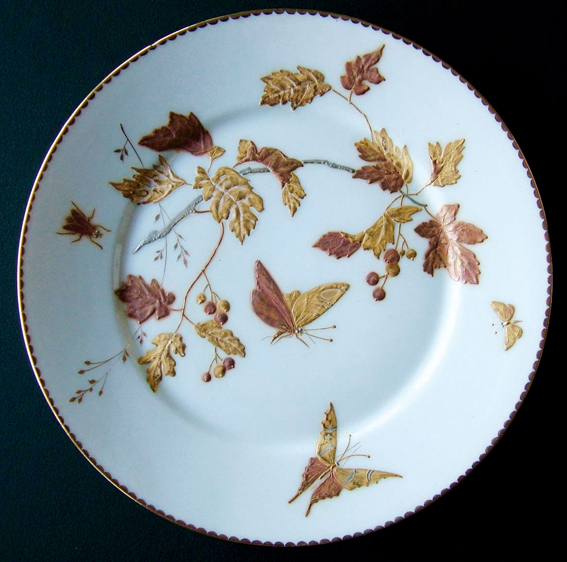
Test plate from the service for Umberto I of Savoy, 1881. Ginori at Doccia, 1881. Richard-Ginori Museum of the Doccia Manufactory.

A prominent figure in these years was Paolo Lorenzini, a valued and trusted collaborator of the Ginori family, replacing the Fanciullacci family, and brother of Carlo Lorenzini, the well-known writer under the pseudonym Collodi.

Among the best painters of this period were Eugenio Riehl and Lorenzo Becheroni (the younger), (Note: Lorenzo Becheroni and his son, who shared his name, both worked as painters at the Ginori manufactory.) credited with the renowned services for Umberto I, now preserved at the Quirinal Palace. Following Benassai's naturalism, the brief tenure of Angelo Marabini at Doccia saw exceptional production of artistic majolica.

In 1878, Lorenzo II died, and his four sons inherited the ownership. The eldest, Carlo Benedetto, was entrusted with the direction, assisted by Paolo Lorenzini. Lorenzini's death in 1891 left Carlo Benedetto without a key figure for management, and the subsequent leadership appointed by Marquis Ginori proved inadequate.

Driven by family demands for division, the need for significant modernization, and an acquisition proposal from Giulio Richard, the Ginori family made the difficult decision to sell the company in 1896 to the Milanese industrialist: "Thus, in 1896, the owners decided to relinquish the glorious and centuries-old family enterprise. The manufactory, with its exemplary artistic and commercial organization, became part of a larger entity named Richard-Ginori, a company well known in Italy and worldwide, which worthily continues the tradition of the Italian porcelain industry."

== Marks ==
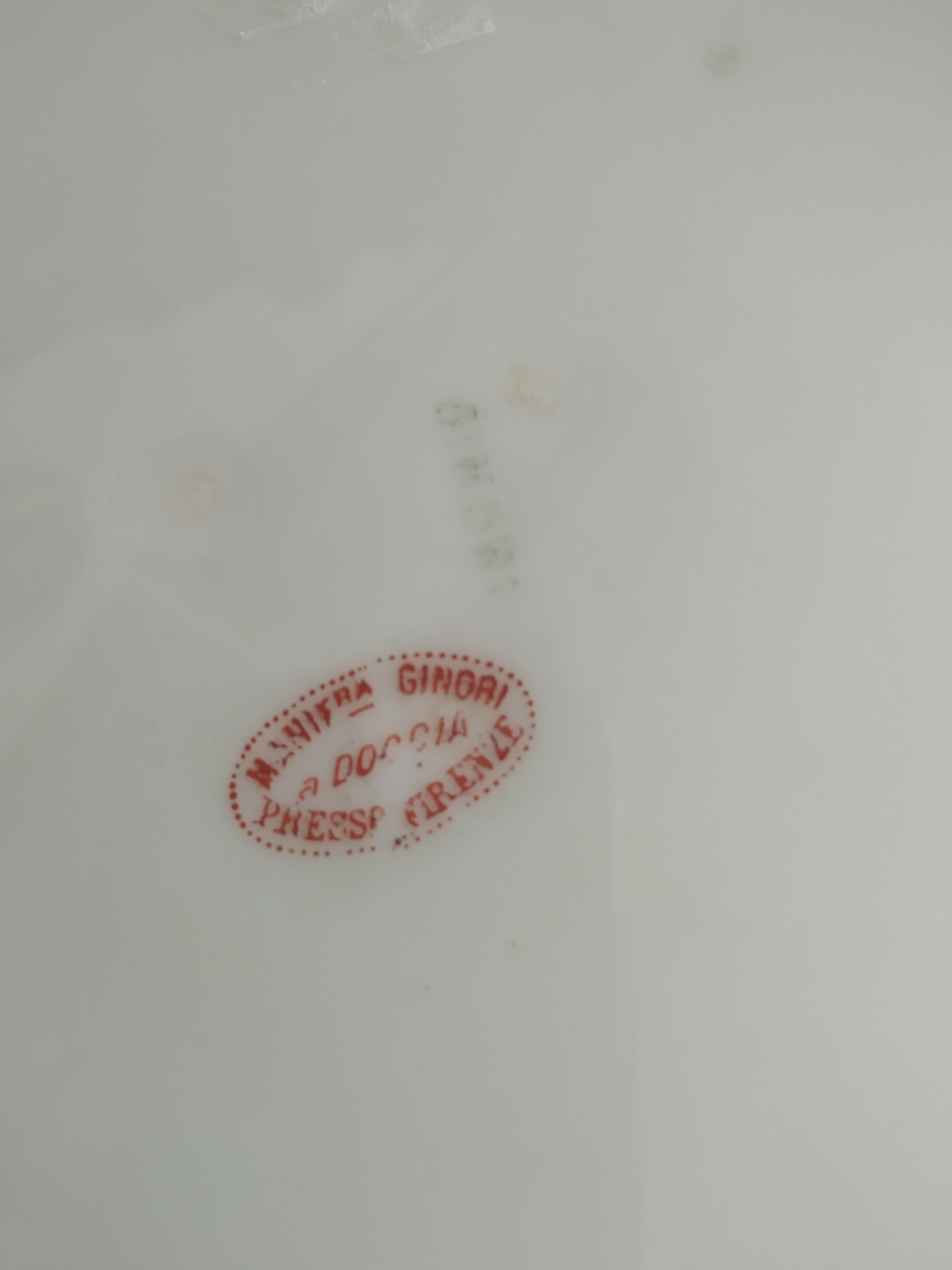
Ginori mark of the Doccia Manufactory

In its early years, the Ginori manufactory at Doccia, like the Viennese Du Paquier manufactory, did not consistently use a mark, unlike Meissen. Nevertheless, attempts were made. For instance, the dome of the Florence Cathedral, already distinctive of Medici porcelain, the eight-pointed star or asterisk, the three stars in the Ginori family crest, and even the dome combined with these stars appear to have been tentative efforts to introduce a factory mark. Without definitive evidence of this intention from Marquis Carlo or his successor Lorenzo, these provide only further points for discussion.

Under Lorenzo Ginori's direction, prompted by Saint Laurent, considerations were made to apply a mark to items produced at Doccia's kilns, both to prevent counterfeiting of porcelain sold in Naples and decorated there in an approximate manner, and because Lorenzo likely wished, for "image" reasons, to distinguish his products from competitors, as most manufactories were already doing.

However, it was not until Carlo Leopoldo Ginori's management that a true mark, the incised asterisk, was used with some consistency, documented from 1780 and almost certainly a simplification of the three stars in the Florentine family's crest. The asterisk or star also appeared during the same period, sometimes painted in gold or overglaze red, continuing into the first half of the 19th century, occasionally alternating with painted numerals or incised P (first choice) and F. (Note: Although the star or asterisk is commonly attributed to a period not extending beyond the first quarter of the 19th century, a significant example is the krater vase "exhibited in 1851 at the Crystal Palace in London during the Great Exhibition of the Works of Industry of All Nations," which bears a gold-painted asterisk under its base.) Subsequently, and primarily on common-use majolica, "GINORI" was stamped until around 1840, while simultaneously on porcelain, a crowned N appeared (with the acquisition of the Royal Ferdinandea Factory's models and the right to reproduce its mark). In the second half of the 19th century, between 1850 and 1890, a G stamped within a vertical lozenge or "Ginori" painted within an oval was used. In the final decades, "Manifattura Ginori" within an oval centered by a star was also used. These latter two types of marks were painted in the colors black, blue, green, and red.

== Bibliography ==
=== Books ===
- Balleri, Rita; Casprini Gentile, Laura; Pollastri, Sara; Rucellai, Oliva (2007). Carlo Ginori - Documenti e Itinerari di un gentiluomo del secolo dei lumi [Carlo Ginori - Documents and Itineraries of an Enlightenment Gentleman]. Florence: Polistampa. ISBN 978-88-596-0143-2.
- Barbantini, Nino; Tarchiani, Nello; Morazzoni, Giuseppe; Lorenzetti, Giulio (1932). Il Settecento italiano (2 vol.) [The Italian 18th Century (2 vol.)]. Rome: Edizioni Bestetti & Tumminelli.
- Bettio, Elisabetta; Rucellai, Oliva (2007). L'Archivio storico Richard-Ginori della Manifattura di Doccia [The Historical Archive of Richard-Ginori of the Doccia Manufactory]. Florence: Polistampa.
- Biancalana, Alessandro (2009). Porcellane e maioliche a Doccia. La fabbrica dei marchesi Ginori. I primi cento anni [Porcelain and Majolica at Doccia. The Ginori Factory. The First Hundred Years]. Florence: Polistampa. ISBN 978-88-596-0630-7.
- d'Agliano, Andreina (1986). Le porcellane italiane a Palazzo Pitti [Italian Porcelain at Palazzo Pitti]. Florence: Centro Di. ISBN 88-7038-118-8.
- d'Agliano, Andreina (1996). Settecento Europeo e Barocco Toscano nelle porcellane di Carlo Ginori a Doccia [European 18th Century and Tuscan Baroque in the Porcelain of Carlo Ginori at Doccia]. Rome: Palombi & Partner. ISBN 88-7621-339-2.
- d'Agliano, Andreina (2002). Porcellane di Doccia della collezione Stibbert [Doccia Porcelain from the Stibbert Collection]. Florence: Museo Stibbert Firenze-Polistampa. ISBN 88-8304-476-2.
- d'Agliano, Andreina; Melegati, Luca (2002). Le porcellane europee della Collezione de Tschudy [European Porcelain from the Tschudy Collection]. Florence: Giunti. ISBN 88-09-02517-2.
- d'Agliano, Andreina (2005). Fonti grafiche e stilistiche di alcuni temi decorativi della Manifattura di Doccia [Graphic and Stylistic Sources of Some Decorative Themes of the Doccia Manufactory]. Pisa: ETS. ISBN 88-467-1216-1.
- Biancalana, Alessandro, ed. (2005). Quando la manifattura diventa arte. Le porcellane e le maioliche di Doccia [When the Manufactory Becomes Art. The Porcelain and Majolica of Doccia]. Pisa: ETS. ISBN 88-467-1216-1.
- Ginori Lisci, Leonardo (1963). La porcellana di Doccia [The Porcelain of Doccia]. Milan: Electa Editrice.
- Lane, Arthur (1963). La porcellana italiana [Italian Porcelain]. Florence: Sansoni.
- Levy, Saul (1960). Le porcellane italiane [Italian Porcelain]. Milan: Gorlich Editore.
- Liverani, Giuseppe; Molajoli, Bruno (1967). Il Museo delle Porcellane di Doccia [The Museum of Doccia Porcelain]. Milan: Richard Ginori.
- Lorenzini, Carlo (1981) [1861]. La Manifattura delle Porcellane di Doccia. Cenni illustrativi raccolti da Carlo Lorenzini [The Doccia Porcelain Manufactory. Illustrative Notes Collected by Carlo Lorenzini]. Florence: Grazzini, Giannini e C.
- Melegati, Luca (1999). Le porcellane europee al Castello Sforzesco [European Porcelain at the Sforzesco Castle]. Cologno Monzese: Artigrafiche Torri.
- Monti, Raffaele, ed. (1988). La Manifattura Richard Ginori di Doccia [The Richard Ginori Manufactory of Doccia]. Milan-Rome: Mondadori-De Luca.
- Mottola Molfino, Alessandra (1976). L'arte della porcellana in Italia [The Art of Porcelain in Italy]. Busto Arsizio: Bramante Editrice.
- Richard-Ginori s.p.a. (2007). Richard-Ginori, 1737-1937. Ceramiche dal Museo della Manifattura di Doccia [Richard-Ginori, 1737-1937. Ceramics from the Museum of the Doccia Manufactory]. Rome: Gangemi. ISBN 978-88-492-1361-4.
- Winter, John (2003). Le statue del marchese Ginori. Sculture in porcellana bianca di Doccia. Catalogo della mostra (Firenze, 26 settembre-5 ottobre 2003) [The Statues of Marquis Ginori. White Porcelain Sculptures of Doccia. Exhibition Catalog (Florence, 26 September–5 October 2003)]. Florence: Polistampa. ISBN 88-8304-617-X.

=== Annual publications, periodicals, and catalogs ===
- Biancalana, Alessandro (1998). La Manifattura dei Ginori nel '700. Decorazioni Pittoriche e forme nella porcellana di Doccia da Carlo a Lorenzo Ginori (1737–1791), in Mario Burresi, La manifattura toscana dei Ginori. Doccia 1737–1791. Catalogo della Mostra [The Ginori Manufactory in the 18th Century. Pictorial Decorations and Forms in Doccia Porcelain from Carlo to Lorenzo Ginori (1737–1791), in Mario Burresi, The Tuscan Ginori Manufactory. Doccia 1737–1791. Exhibition Catalog].
- Biancalana, Alessandro (1999). "La figura di un secondo Johan Carl Anreiter figlio di Karl Wendelin" [The Figure of a Second Johan Carl Anreiter, Son of Karl Wendelin]. Ceramica Antica. 9.
- Biancalana, Alessandro (2000). "Johann Karl Wendelin Anreiter von Ziernfeld (1702-1747)" [Johann Karl Wendelin Anreiter von Ziernfeld (1702-1747)]. Der Schlern. 2.
- Biancalana, Alessandro (2005). Lehner Jobst C.; d'Agliano A. (eds.). "Die Entstehungsgeschichte der Manufaktur Doccia, in "Barocker Luxus Porzellan". Catalogo della Mostra" [The Founding History of the Doccia Manufactory, in "Baroque Luxury Porcelain". Exhibition Catalog]. Kraftner J.
- Biancalana, Alessandro (2006). "Terre, massi, vernici e colori della Manifattura Ginori dalla sua nascita agli albori del XIX secolo" [Clays, Stones, Glazes, and Colors of the Ginori Manufactory from Its Founding to the Dawn of the 19th Century]. Faenza. 4–6.
- Biancalana, Alessandro (2007). "I pittori della Manifattura di Doccia dal 1740 al 1784" [The Painters of the Doccia Manufactory from 1740 to 1784]. Amici di Doccia - Quaderni. I.
- d'Agliano, Andreina (2008). "Alcune porcellane di Doccia al Museo Civico di Torino" [Some Doccia Porcelain at the Turin Civic Museum]. Amici di Doccia - Quaderni. I.
- d'Albis, A.; Biancalana, A. (2008). "Un voyage a Paris de Bartolomeo Ginori en 1771" [A Journey to Paris by Bartolomeo Ginori in 1771]. Sèvres. Revue de la societè des Amis du Musée National de Ceramique. 17.
- Carola Perrotti, Angela (1972). "Porcellane di Doccia alla Floridiana" [Doccia Porcelain at the Floridiana]. Arte Illustrata. 49 (June).
- Carola Perrotti, Angela (2008). "I marchi del giglio di Capodimonte e della "N coronata" ferdinandea nelle porcellane di Doccia" [The Lily Marks of Capodimonte and the Crowned "N" of Ferdinandea in Doccia Porcelain]. Amici di Doccia. Quaderni. II.
