= Carlo Ginori =

Italian politician and businessman (1702–1757)

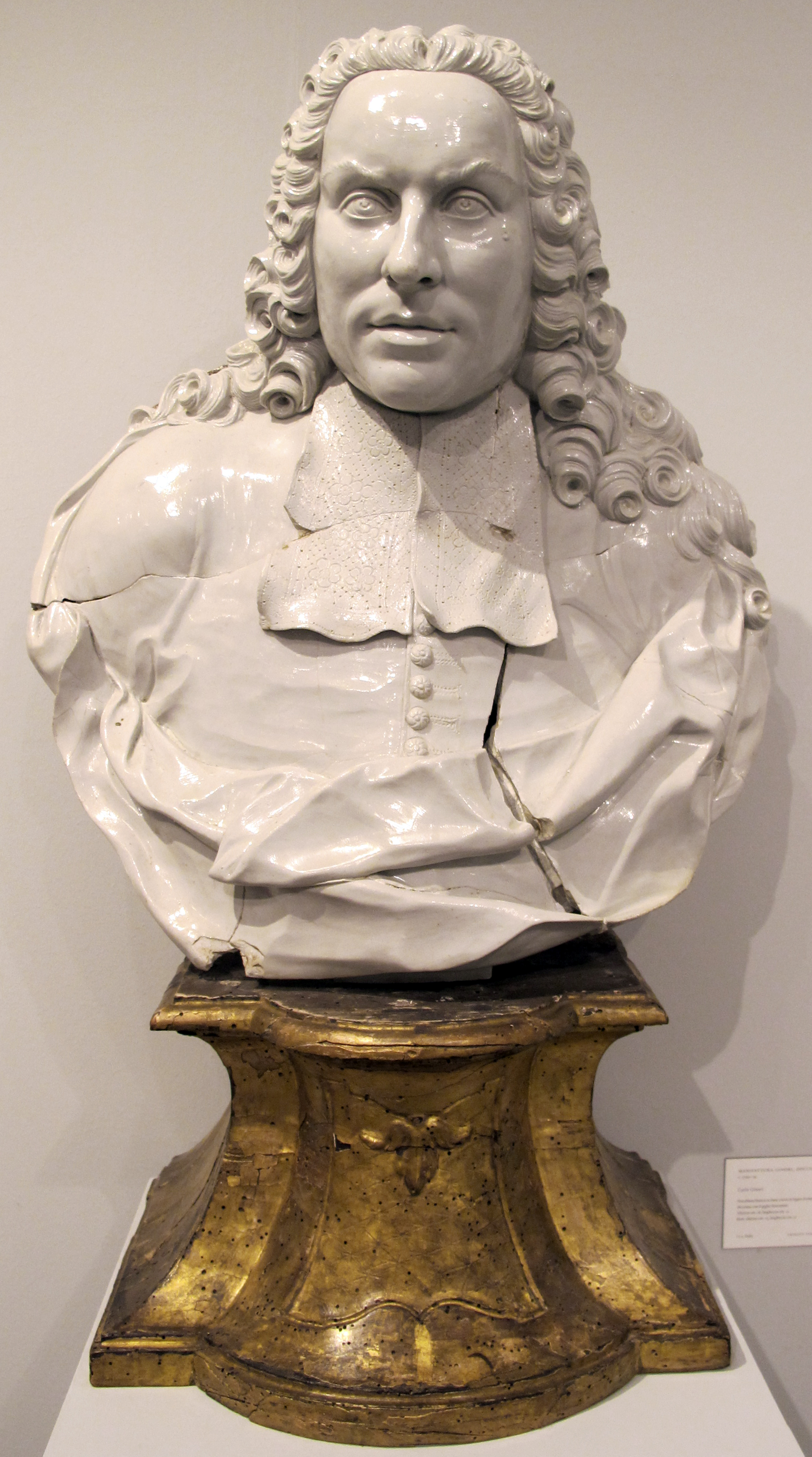
Bust of Marchese Carlo Ginori in his Doccia porcelain

Marchese Carlo Ginori (1702–1757) was an Italian politician of the Grand Duchy of Tuscany, and the founder of the Doccia porcelain factory in Sesto Fiorentino, near Florence, Italy. He pioneered the development of porcelain production, contemporary with Meissen, in mid-eighteenth-century Europe. Ginori's porcelain was collected by Medicis and most of the nobility of Europe. Napoleon's wife, Marie Louise of Austria, ordered an enormous service set that survives to this day.

The 16th century passion for oriental pottery, which was imported into Europe at great expense, and affordable only by a few of the very wealthiest families, led the Medicis to found the first European porcelain factory in Florence. That short lived venture was followed in 1737 with the founding of Ginori factory at Doccia.
