= Ticciati =

Ticciati is an Italian surname. Notable persons with this name include:

- Francesco Ticciati (1893–1949), Italian composer, concert pianist, piano teacher and lecturer
- Girolamo Ticciati (1676–1744), Italian sculptor and architect
- Hugo Ticciati (born 1980), British-born violinist living in Sweden
- Robin Ticciati (born 1983), British conductor
