= Liceo Statale Niccolò Machiavelli =

Secondary school in Florence, Italy

Liceo Niccolò Machiavelli
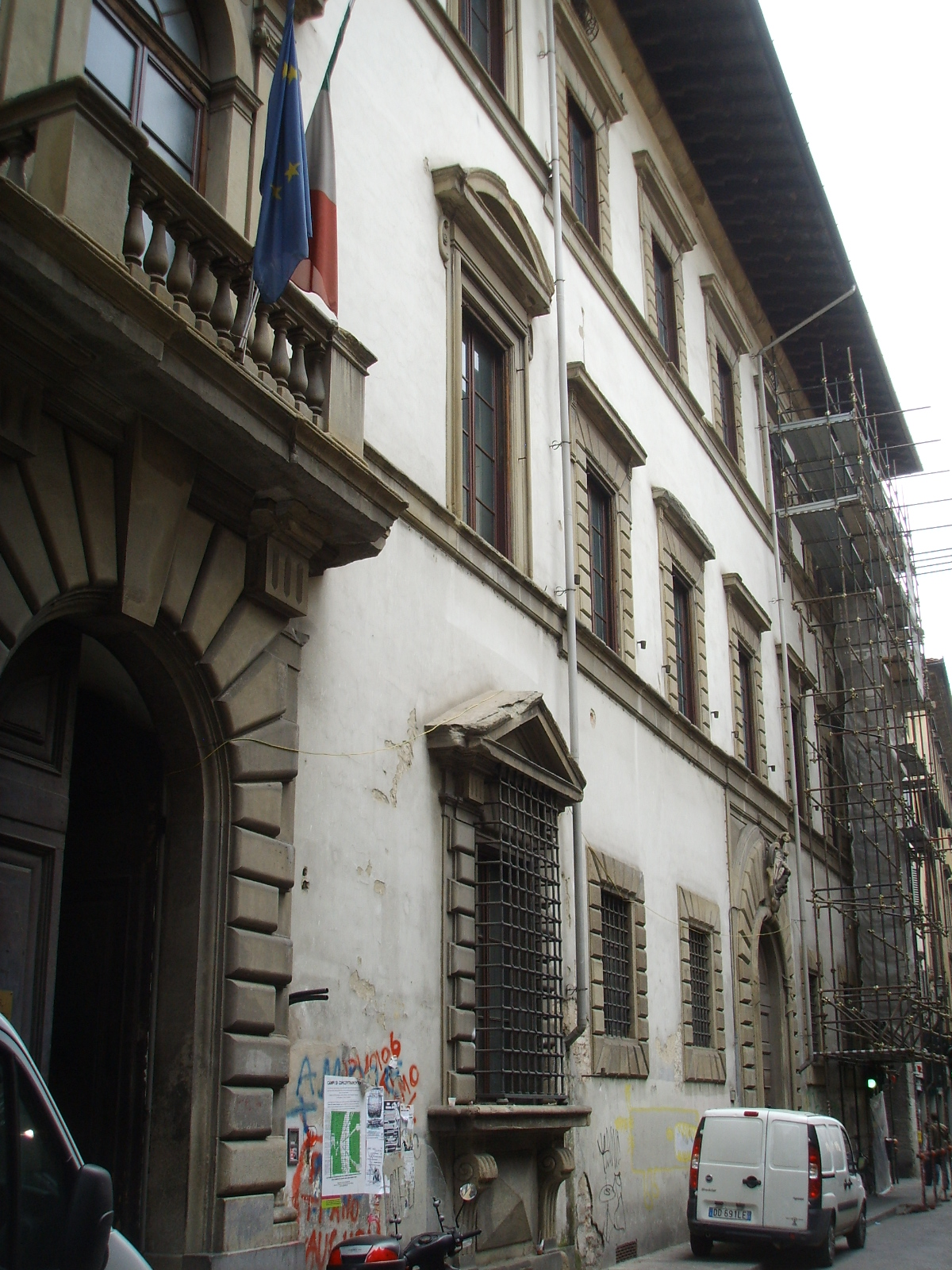

Location
- via Santo Spirito, 39; Florence, 50125; Italy
- Coordinates: 43.768943°N 11.246721°E

Information
- Type: Liceo classico, Liceo delle Scienze Umane, Liceo Linguistico, Liceo Scientifico
- Established: 1860
- Enrollment: 1700
- Newspaper: Hermes
- Website: www.liceomachiavelli-firenze.edu.it/it/index.php?id=0&label=Home

The Liceo statale "Niccolò Machiavelli" is a high school named after Niccolò Machiavelli located in the historic Oltrarno quarter of Florence, Italy. In the 2020 academic year it offered the secondary schools Liceo classico, Liceo delle Scienze Umane (with a social economics option), Liceo Linguistico and Liceo Scientifico. It has a student population of over 1700, making it the second largest high school in the province. Initially based in the Fortezza da Basso, the school was moved Palazzo Rinuccini, in Via S. Spirito, in 2004. The branch of the school housing the international linguistic and international scientific departments is located in Palazzo Frescobaldi, also known as Della Missione. It is one of the oldest Italian normal schools for girls and has hosted the courses of one of the two Royal Higher Education Institutes.

== History ==
=== Liceo Ginnasio Niccolò Machiavelli ===
The Liceo Ginnasio Niccolò Machiavelli was founded in 1968 following the transfer of the Fortezza da Basso from the Italian military to the public in 1967. It is the youngest classical high school in the city. The building that houses the modern day high school is the Machiavelli pavilion of the exhibition center at the Fortezza, for which renovations are planned in 2020–21.

=== Istituto Magistrale Gino Capponi ===
==== Scuola magistrale sperimentale femminile (Magistral and Experimental School for Women) ====
In 1860, the Magistral and Experimental School for women was founded in Palazzo Frescobaldi as one of the nine experimental women's schools founded in Italy at the time. It was designed to be an experimental school with different timetables from the other Italian teaching schools. The experimental school was disbanded in 1869 and, after its reorganization by a commission, was reformed as the Scuola Normale Feminine in Florence, which continued to operate until 1824, the year of its conversion into a Magistral Institute.

==== Regio Istituto Superiore di Magistero (Royal Higher Female Magisterial Institute) ====
From 1882 to 1901, the year in which it was moved to del Parione, Palazzo Frescobaldi also housed the Royal Higher Female Magisterium Institute, one of only two such institutes in Italy (the other was located in Rome).

==== Istituto Magistrale (Teaching Institute) ====
In 1924, following the Gentile reform, which abolished the Normal school and created the Magistral Institutes, the school was converted into a Magistral Institute and named after Gino Capponi, an Italian statesman and historian.

The school continued to exist as a Magistral Institute until 1997, when it was merged with the Liceo Ginnasio Machiavelli.

=== The modern day Liceo Statale Niccolò Machiavelli (o Machiavelli-Capponi) ===
The current Niccolò Machiavelli State High School was created in 1997 following the merger of the Liceo Ginnasio Machiavelli and the Magistral Institute. In 2004, due to the start of renovations and reuse of the Fortezza da Basso, the classical high school, still teaching in the Fortezza, was moved to Palazzo Rinuccini, formerly the seat of the Lucrezia Tornabuoni Professional Institute. The Magistral Institute (now of Human Sciences) was moved from its historic headquarters in Palazzo Rinuccini, and the International Linguistic and Scientific Addresses were established in Palazzo Frescobaldi to provide for the common two-year period.

== Architecture ==
=== Palazzo Rinuccini ===
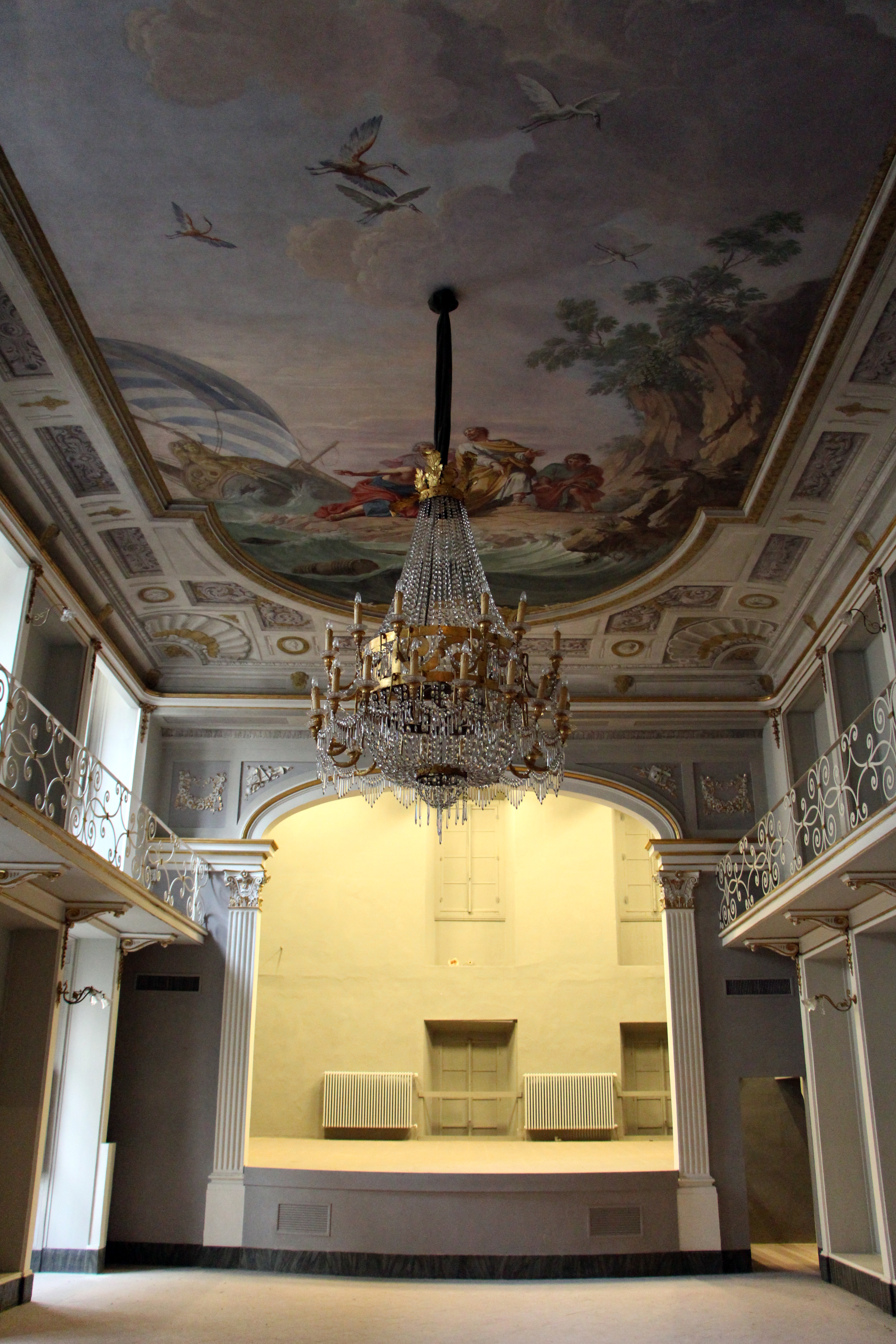
The theatre og Palazzo Rinuccini

Palazzo Rinuccini is actually the union of several adjacent buildings that were built separately and joined in the eighteenth century by a single facade. In addition to the facade, other important works were carried out in the eighteenth century: the stairs, the garden and many of the frescoes and statues date back to that time. Between the eighteenth and nineteenth centuries the Rinuccini family bought the neighboring buildings, which they used to enlarge the building and make stables. In the following century some parts of the ancient stables became the Rinuccini Theater, annexed and used by the school for theatrical performances and conferences. After the end of the male heirs of the family, the palace passed to the daughters of the last heir. It was later purchased by the municipality, who used it as a professional institute (Istituto Professionale Lucrezia Tornabuoni). In 1997, the building was purchased by the province and was renovated to be used by the Machiavelli high school in 2004.

=== Palazzo Frescobaldi or della Missione ===
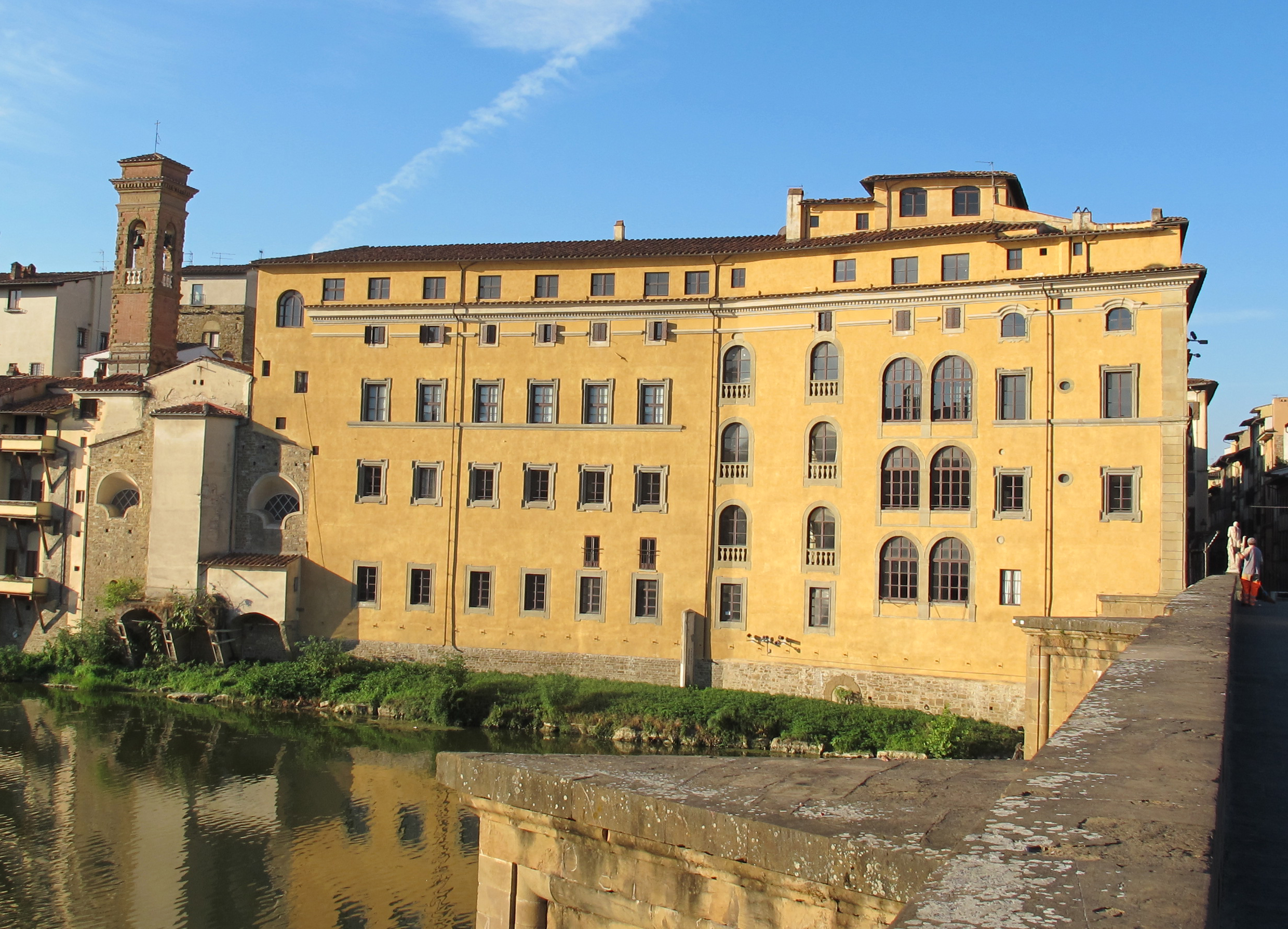
The Palazzo della Missione

The mission palace is built on the location of what was once the most important palace of the Frescobaldi family. Little remains of this ancient building: it was destroyed by a fire between the thirteenth and fourteenth centuries and then partially demolished and rebuilt in the sixteenth century. From the 16th century it was occupied by various religious congregations; during the period of Firenze Capitale it was the seat of the ministry of the navy before becoming a school building.

== Library ==
The library includes the holdings of the former Machiavelli (over 6000 volumes) and Capponi institutes (over 8000 volumes). Furthermore, since 2017, cataloging according to the Decimal Dewey system has begun. The online catalog is accessible from the school's official website.

== "Confucius" class experimentation ==
In 2013, the school was the first in Tuscany to begin, in collaboration with Sant'Anna di Pisa University and the University of Chongqing in China, the Confucius project. This project provides an opportunity for thirty students from the institute to attend the Chinese university for a portion of the year.

== Statistics (years 2010-2015) ==
The student population is about 2/3 female and 1/3 male. There is a small number of foreigners, including second generation students. About 70-80 people pass the final exam.

== See also ==
- Palazzo Rinuccini
