= Francesco Ticciati =

Italian composer

Francesco Ticciati (20 December 1893 – 10 February 1949) was an Italian composer, concert pianist, piano teacher and lecturer.

== Life ==
Born in Rome, he studied at the Accademia Nazionale di Santa Cecilia, studying piano with Francesco Baiardi, conducting with Giacomo Sentaccuoli and composition with Ottorino Respighi.

Around the end of the First World War, Francesco came to England and in 1920 he married Maria Stierli, with whom he had a daughter, Maeve, and a son, Niso.

“On 21 September 1920 he played Mendelssohn's First Concerto, and on 9 October of the same year the Busoni transcription of Liszt's Rhapsodie espagnole, a week later making his recital debut at the Wigmore Hall; that programme contained favourite pieces he was still playing 20 years later - Bach's Italian Concerto, Beethoven's 'Waldstein' Sonata, Chopin's Cjt minor Scherzo, Berceuse, Fantasy- Impromptu and Al> Polonaise, and the three of Liszt's Paganini Etudes - Capriccio, La chasse, …[and] La campanella.”

On the first night of the 1921 Prom season, Francesco contributed with the Weber Konzertstück. He performed again on the 25 August and premiered his Poema gregoñano, "a three-movement concerto composed in London at the end of the previous year to show how the Gregorian tones, which look back to the ancient Greeks, could still be used." He continued to play at the Proms for many years to come, performing Beethoven’s ‘Emperor’ Concerto, Busoni’s Liszt transcription, and his own much-admired Poema gregoñano amongst others.

For a time he was music director at Teatro dei Piccolo (the famous Marionette company founded by Vittorio Podrecca in 1923). During this period he also made many powerful performances in England, including both as pianist and composer at Robert Newman’s Promenade Concerts at the Queen’s Hall, with Sir Henry Wood conducting.

In 1927 he formed a trio, The Philharmonic Trio, including the flautist Albert Fransella (1865–1935), later Robert Murchie (1884-1949) and Leon Goossens (1897–1988), for whom he composed a concerto that was later conducted by Sir Thomas Beecham in 1929. Other partners included Angel Grandi, Frida Dancyger and Manilo Di Veroli.

In January 1937 The Musical Times recorded him passing the written examination for Doctor of Music at London University, via Trinity College, his exercise was a Symphony in F.

Francesco became a British citizen in 1936, in 1942 he became a lecturer to the troops on music. The BBC proceeded to offer him a sizable retainer of £800 to cover all broadcasting he might wish to do, however, Francesco declined the offer, saying he needed more time for composing.

In his later years, he settled in Amersham, where he lived at The Music Studio, Chestnut Close, until he died in 1949. He was a prominent figure within the music crowd of Amersham, often teaching and giving talks.

In an article titled ‘The Birth of a Dynasty: Remembering Francesco Ticciati’ the writer Leo Black comments; ‘The name has been associated with art forms since the time of the sculptor and architect Girolamo Ticciati (1671–1744)

His son Niso Ticciati (1924–1972) was a composer and arranger, his grandchildren include the designer Giovanna Ticciati and his great-grandchildren include the violinist Hugo Ticciati and conductor Robin Ticciati. Robin Ticciati made his debut at The Proms as a conductor in 2010 at the age of 27.
