= Kendall Taylor =

British pianist (1905–1999)

Edgar Kendall Taylor CBE, FRCM, Hon. FRAM
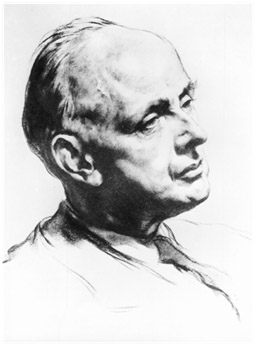
- Portrait of Edgar Kendall Taylor
- Born: 27 July 1905; Sheffield, UK
- Died: 5 December 1999 (aged 94); Wimbledon, London, UK
- Education: Royal College of Music
- Occupations: Pianist; Teacher; Pedagogue
- Known for: Concertos Broadcast on the BBC
- Spouse: Mirjana Nikolic (m. 1950)

Edgar Kendall Taylor CBE, FRCM, Hon. FRAM (27 July 1905 – 5 December 1999) was a British pianist, who had an international career as a solo concert pianist. In the United Kingdom, he was well known for his concerts, which were broadcast on the BBC. He was also known for his recitals and broadcasts to the troops during World War II through the Entertainments National Service Association. He also had a career as a teacher and pedagogue.

== Early life ==
Kendall Taylor was born in Sheffield, England. He made his concert début at the age of six accompanying his father, Maurice Taylor, a well-known cellist. His debut with a professional orchestra was at the age of 12 with a rendition of Mozart's D minor concerto, K.466. In 1923, he won an open scholarship to the Royal College of Music (RCM). There he studied piano with Herbert Fryer (a pupil of Oscar Beringer and later Ferruccio Busoni), composition with Gustav Holst, and conducting with Adrian Boult and Malcolm Sargent.

== Professional career ==
While a student at the RCM, he performed concertos with leading British orchestras which were broadcast on the BBC.

In 1926, he made his first professional performance at a Promenade Concert conducted by Sir Henry Wood. This was the first of 26 appearances as a solo pianist at a Promenade concert—in two of which he was soloist for the Last Night of the Proms. In 1927, he was the only British pianist chosen to play at the Esposition Internationale de Musique in Geneva, where he won the praise of Alfred Cortot, Arthur Rubinstein and Ernest Schelling. In 1929, he was appointed Professor of Piano at the RCM where he continued teaching there for a record 63 years until his retirement in 1993.

In 1938, he joined the Grinke piano trio with violinist Frederick Grinke and cellist Florence Hooton. He also performed duos with both Grinke and Hooton.

During World War II, he gave numerous broadcasts and recitals for troops with the Entertainments National Service Association. He travelled often, and frequently performed at multiple locations daily.

After the war, he performed in frequent overseas tours in the United States, Canada, Australia, and Southern Africa where he performed with many of the world's leading orchestras, and often including works by 20th-century composers. He performed in Britain and around Europe with conductors including: Klemperor, Barbirolli, Boult, Sargent and Colin Davis. He was Barbirolli's chosen concerto soloist at concerts in Vienna with the Vienna Philharmonic orchestra. He gave recitals in all of the countries he visited, and often premiered new work, including works by British composers.

== Teaching ==
Taylor worked as a professor at the RCM from 1929 to 1993. He also gave lectures in many venues around the world, and sat on competition juries and award panels Many of his pupils had distinguished careers, some of his successful pupils include: Rose Goldblatt, Ireneus Zuk, Jan Latham-Koenig, Yu Chun Ye, Dusan Trbojevic, Yonty Solomon, Tony Hewitt, Michael Redshaw, Carl Rütti, Enloc Wu, Vanessa Latarche, Andrew Ball, Rudi Martinus van Dijk, Kathryn Stott, Piers Lane, Howard Shelley, Paul Stewart and Hilary Macnamara.

In later years he gave many lecture-recitals, focusing particularly on the life and work of Beethoven. He established a Beethoven prize for pianists at the RCM.

After his death a scholarship, the Kendall Taylor Award, was established in his memory to sponsor British pianists studying at the RCM.

== Personal life ==
Taylor was married twice. He met his second wife, Mirjana, while on a concert tour of the Balkans in 1947. They were married for nearly 50 years until his death in 1999. Kendall Taylor had a daughter and a step-daughter, both of whom studied at the RCM. His two grandchildren are both professional musicians.

== Death ==
Kendall Taylor died on 5 December 1999 in Wimbledon, England.

== Honors ==
- 1982 appointed a Commander of the Order of the British Empire (CBE)
- 1982 appointed President of EPTA (UK)
- 1993 Founder President (UK) of the Beethoven Piano Society of Europe
- Vice-President and Senior Professor of the Royal College of Music – for several years and until his retirement
- Hon. Professor of Belgrade Academy of Music
- Hon. Fellow of the Royal Academy of Music

== Publications ==
- Kendall Taylor 'Principles of Piano Technique and Interpretation' publ Novello 1981
- Kendall Taylor An annotated edition of the complete Beethoven Piano Sonatas, 4 vols, publ Allans Australia 1987
- Many articles in Journals (e.g. Piano Journal, Arietta, etc.)
- Compositions for Voice and Piano

== Recordings ==
- John Ireland, Phantasie Trio of 1908, the 1938 Trio no 3 in E major, and The Holy Boy (with Florence Hooton (cello) and Frederick Grinke (violin)),
- Frank Bridge Phantasy trio
- Beethoven trio in E flat Op 70 no 2
- Stanford trio
- Dvořák G major Sonatina Op 100 with Frederick Grinke
- Mozart Sonatas for violin and piano, with Frederick Grinke, Decca
- Beethoven Sonatas for piano Op 109, Op 110 and Op 111, Meridian
- In addition to the commercial recordings there are numerous recordings from broadcasts and live performances held in the BBC archive and the National Sound Archive at the British Library
