= Palazzo Bonaparte =

Palazzo Bonaparte (Roma)
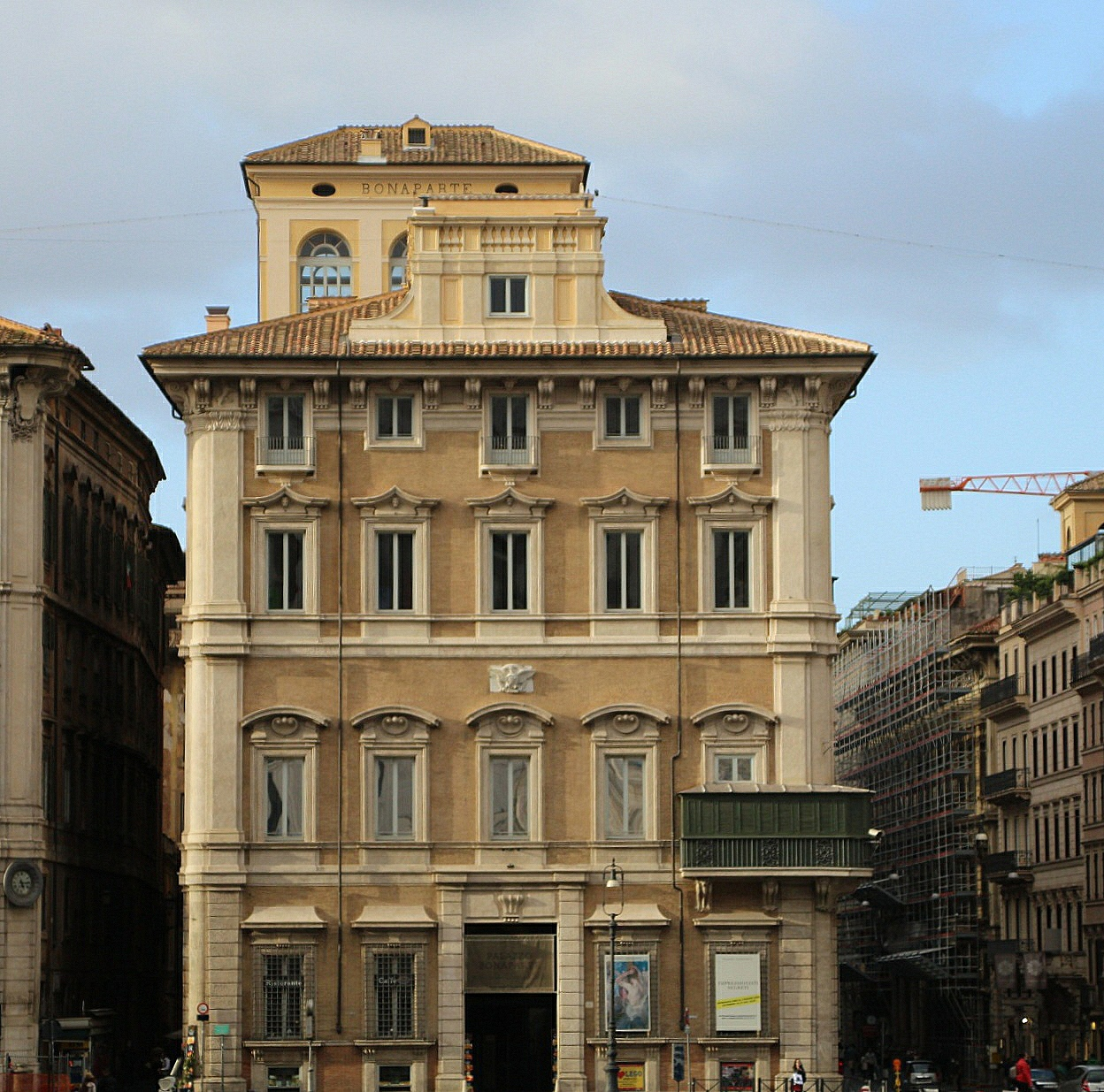
- Facade of the Palazzo Bonaparte in Piazza Venezia 5
- Interactive map of the Palazzo Bonaparte (Roma) area

General information
- Status: In use
- Type: Palace
- Architectural style: Mannerist
- Location: Rome, Lazio, Italy, 5, Piazza Venezia
- Coordinates: 41.8975°N 12.4818°E
- Construction started: 1657
- Completed: 1677

Design and construction
- Architect: Giovanni Antonio De Rossi

Palazzo Bonaparte, formerly D'Aste Rinuccini, is a palace in Rome overlooking Piazza Venezia, in the Pigna district.

== History ==
The building was constructed between 1657 and 1677 to a design by the architect Giovanni Antonio De Rossi on behalf of the marquises Giuseppe and Benedetto d’Aste. Little is known of the palace’s history in the following years until 1760, when it passed to the Florentine nobleman Folco Rinuccini, third marquis of Baselice.

In 1818 the property was purchased, for the price of 27,000 gold piastres, by Maria Letizia Ramolino, mother of the French Emperor Napoleon Bonaparte, who lived there until her death in 1836. Ramolino used to sit on the side balcony to admire the passage of carriages in the then St. Mark’s Square, enlisting the help of a lady-in-waiting when she became blind.

The heirs, the Bonaparte princes of Canino and Musignano, sold it in 1905 to the Marquises Misciatelli, while from 1972 it passed to the insurance company INA Assitalia, later acquired by Assicurazioni Generali in 2013.

Between 2017 and 2019, through the Valore e Cultura programme, Arthemisia, a company active in the field of exhibition organisation, set up its headquarters there following restoration and redevelopment of the building.

== Description ==
=== Exteriors ===
The palace has two main façades on Piazza Venezia and Via del Corso, maintaining its main entrance, consisting of a simple rectangular portal, on the central Roman square. The façade on the piazza presents, flanking the portal, four architraved windows with sills that surmount four small windows in the basement.

The main floor is punctuated by five windows with curved tympanums decorated with shells, while the central one is surmounted by the coat of arms of the Bonapartes of Canino supported by an eagle. The well-known covered corner balcony, called mignano or bussolotto, is not present in a 1675 print by Giovanni Battista Falda, thus representing a later addition. On the second floor are five more windows with triangular tympanum and lion heads. The façade ends with five small windows, three with balconies, and a rich cornice supported by coupled corbels. The building is surmounted by a sloping roof at the centre of which is a terraced mansard.

In an off-centre position is a rectangular altana with the inscription 'Bonaparte' on the long sides and 'De Aste' on the short sides.

The façade on Via del Corso has the same characteristics as the previous one, but extends nine windows. An external courtyard also opens onto Vicolo Doria, forming an indentation to give light to the long atrium and staircase.

=== Interior ===
The rooms of the noble flat are decorated with 18th-century frescoes and stuccoes, commissioned by the Rinuccini family.

== Bibliography ==
=== Italian sources ===
- Giorgio Carpaneto, I palazzi di Roma, Newton Compton, Roma, 1991.
- Carlo Pietrangeli, Guide rionali di Roma, Pigna (IX), parte terza, Roma, Fratelli Palombi Editori, 1977.
- Sergio Delli (1988). Le strade di Roma. Roma: Newton & Compton.
