= Persio Flacco Theater =

Theatre and opera house in Volterra, Italy

Coordinates: 43.4028°N 10.8592°E

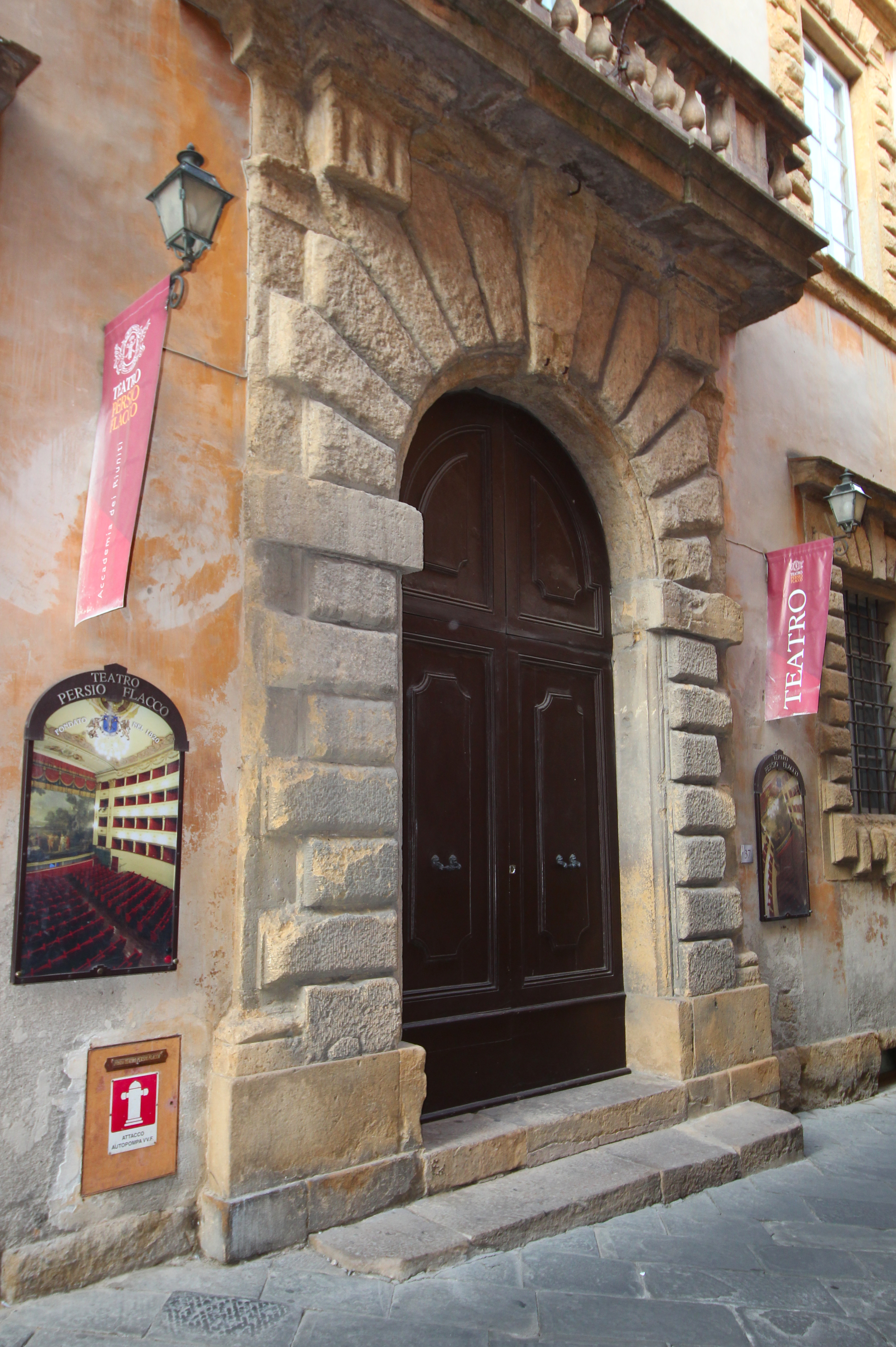
An Image of Persio Flacco Theater

The Persio Flacco is an active opera and theater stage in Volterra, Italy.

== History ==
Volterra still lacked a proper indoor performance stage in the early nineteenth century. In 1816 a group of citizens, including cavaliere Bartolommeo Falchi, cavaliere Mario Maffei, Luigi Ducci, Francesco Cinci, and Luigi Campani, commissioned the architect Luigi Campani (an architect of the Grand Duke Ferdinand III of Tuscany). The theater was erected on the site of the palazzo belonging to Marchesi Incontri. Work began in 1816 and the theater was inaugurated in 1820.

=== Description ===
The main curtain (sipario) was painted by Nicola Contestabili, who represented Aulus Persius Flaccus, a Roman satirist and playwright born in Volterra, being led by the muses to the summit of Parnassus, ruled by Apollo. This gave the theater its final name. The ceiling over the seats was painted with Venus in a chariot drawn by swans, and the parapets, with cupids, garlands and vignettes, harmonizing with the curtain. All these beautiful decorations were lost with subsequent restorations.

=== Ongoing care ===
In 1820, a group of 60 prominent citizens formed the Academy of the Riuniti (of the reunited), and purchased the entire theater, assigning to each member property of the individual boxes and seats, and this organization has continuously maintained that theatrical activity.

The theater was closed for physical repairs for 15 years, from 1984 to 1999, before the reopening, members donated their ownerships of seats and boxes to the academy. This availed them of funds to pursue reconstruction.

== Sources ==
- Theater website
- Guida di Volterra, Benedetto Sborgi, Tipografia Sborgi, 1903, pages 123-124
