= Girolamo Ticciati =

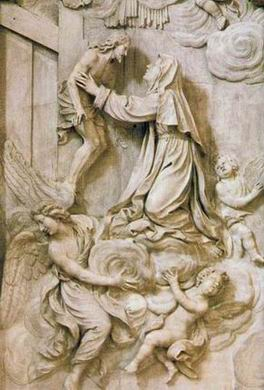
Ticciati, S. Caterina abbracciata dal Crocifisso, basilica di s. caterina prato

Girolamo Ticciati (1676–1744) was an Italian sculptor and architect.

== Life ==
Born in Florence, Girolamo attended the Academy Toscana Granducale in Rome and studied under the Florentine sculptor Giovanni Battista Foggini.

In 1708 he moved to Vienna, where he became a sculptor and architect to the imperial court. He later returned to Florence, where he had great influence over intellectual life. He was a member of Florence's La Colombaria; a society carrying out historical, philological and scientific studies.

Ticciati's work can be seen throughout Italy and in major churches including the Santi Vicenzo e Caterina de' Ricci, Prato, where a series of framed relief sculptures stand above the altar and nave.

In Sotheby's 2010 'The Winter Collection', Ticciati's terracotta piece 'Relief with the Adoration of the Magi' was auctioned and sold at £87,5000. The catalogue states Ticciati is 'emerging as a defined personality' in the continuing reassessment of sculpture from the late Baroque period.

The Ticciati family has continued to be associated with the arts; the pianist and composer Francesco Ticciati (1893–1949), composer and arranger Niso Ticciati (1924–1972) and in the present day: the designer Giovanna Ticciati, the violinist Hugo Ticciati and his brother the conductor Robin Ticciati.

== Works ==
=== Architecture ===
Oratory of the Holy Cross to Borgo San Lorenzo Basilica dei Santi Vincenzo e Caterina de' Ricci

=== Carvings ===
- Tomb of Galileo Galilei (Santa Croce, Florence along with Vincenzo Foggini
- Fra 'Giovanni da Salerno (1735), cloister of Santa Maria Novella, Florence
- Arcangelo Raffaello and San Giovanni di Dio, at the di soccorrere un povero (1738), Ospedale di San Giovanni di Dio, Florence
- Gloria di San Giovanni Battista, Baptistery of St. John the Baptist, preserved in the Museo dell’Opera del Dumomo
- Architettura, Palazzo Rinuccini, Florence
- San Pietro, San Piero a Sieve
- Verità, Victoria and Albert Museum

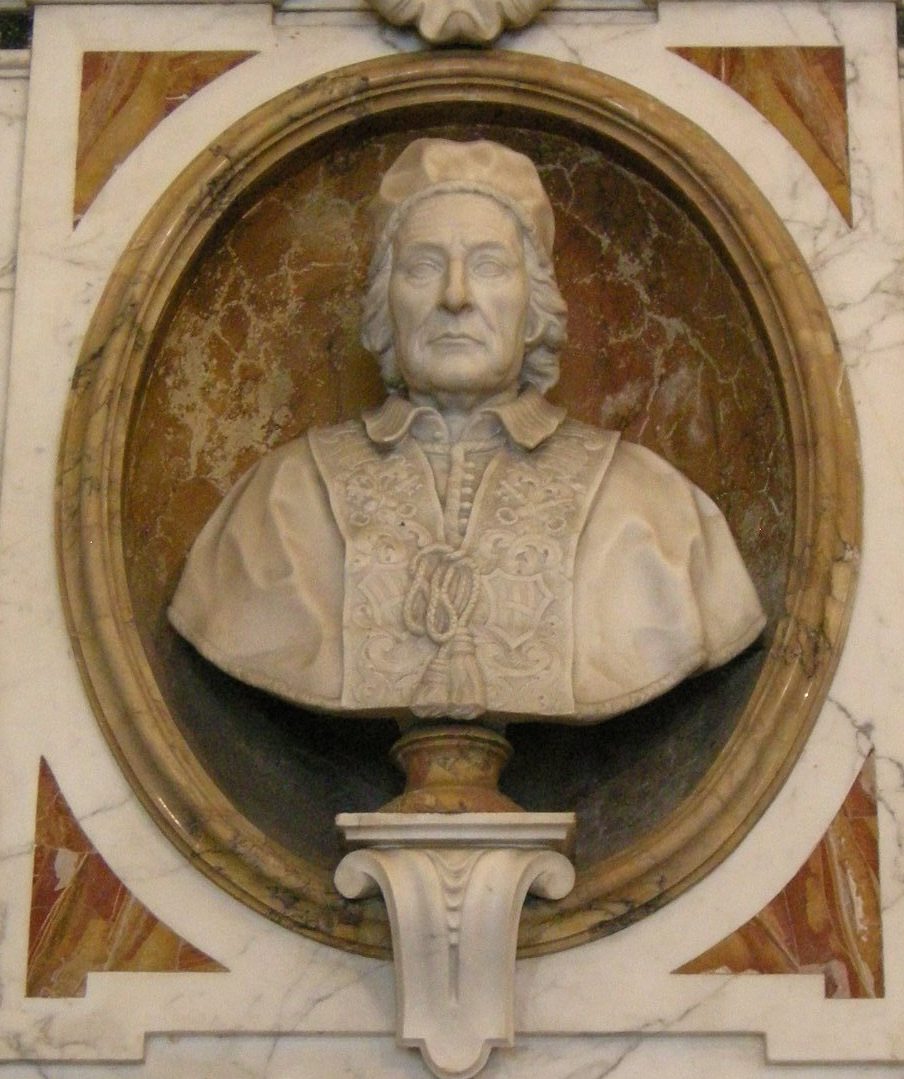
Santo spirito, cappella corsini, busto di clemente XII di girolamo ticciati 02

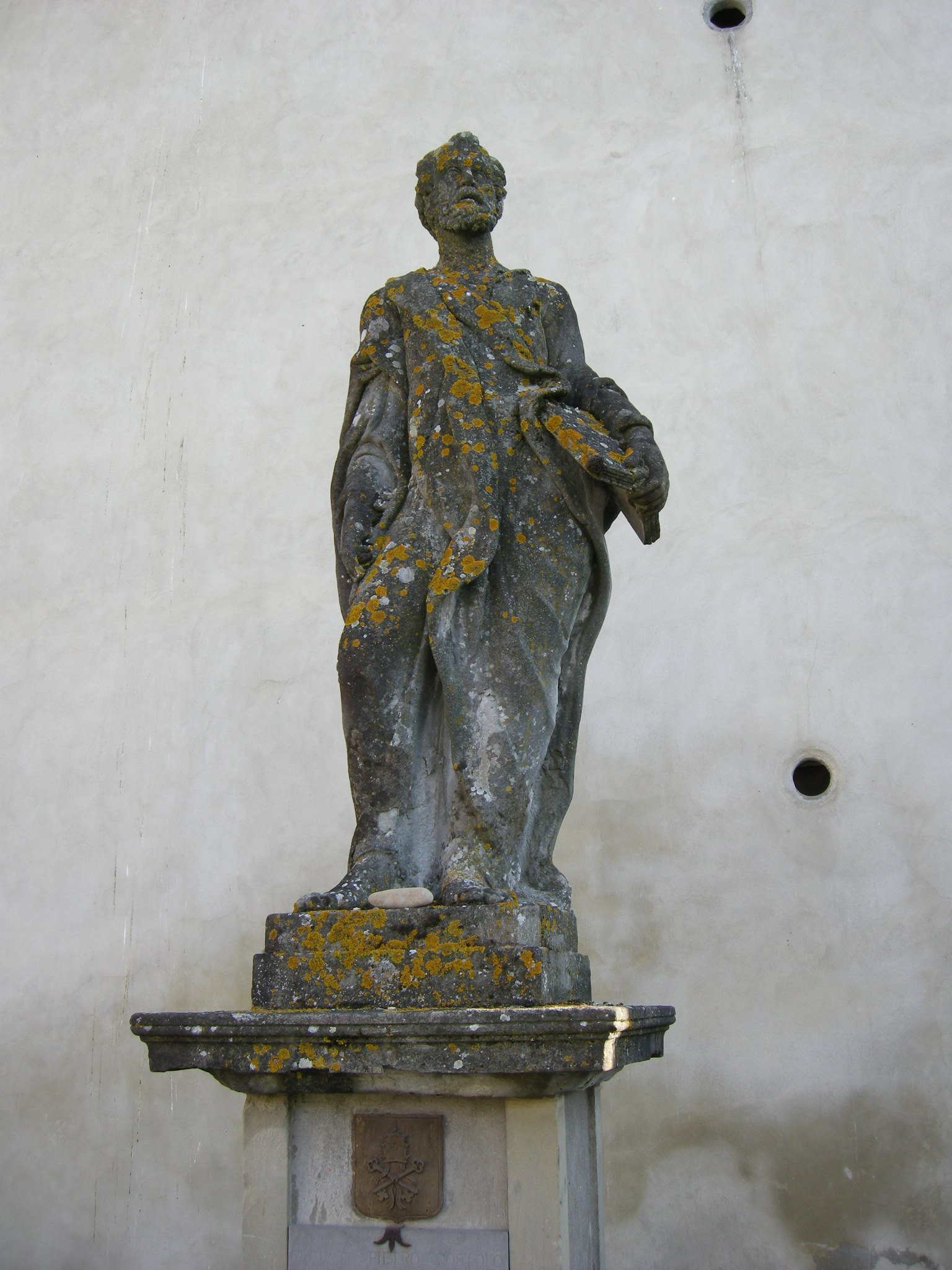
Pieve di San Pietro (San Piero a Sieve), statua di girolamo ticciati

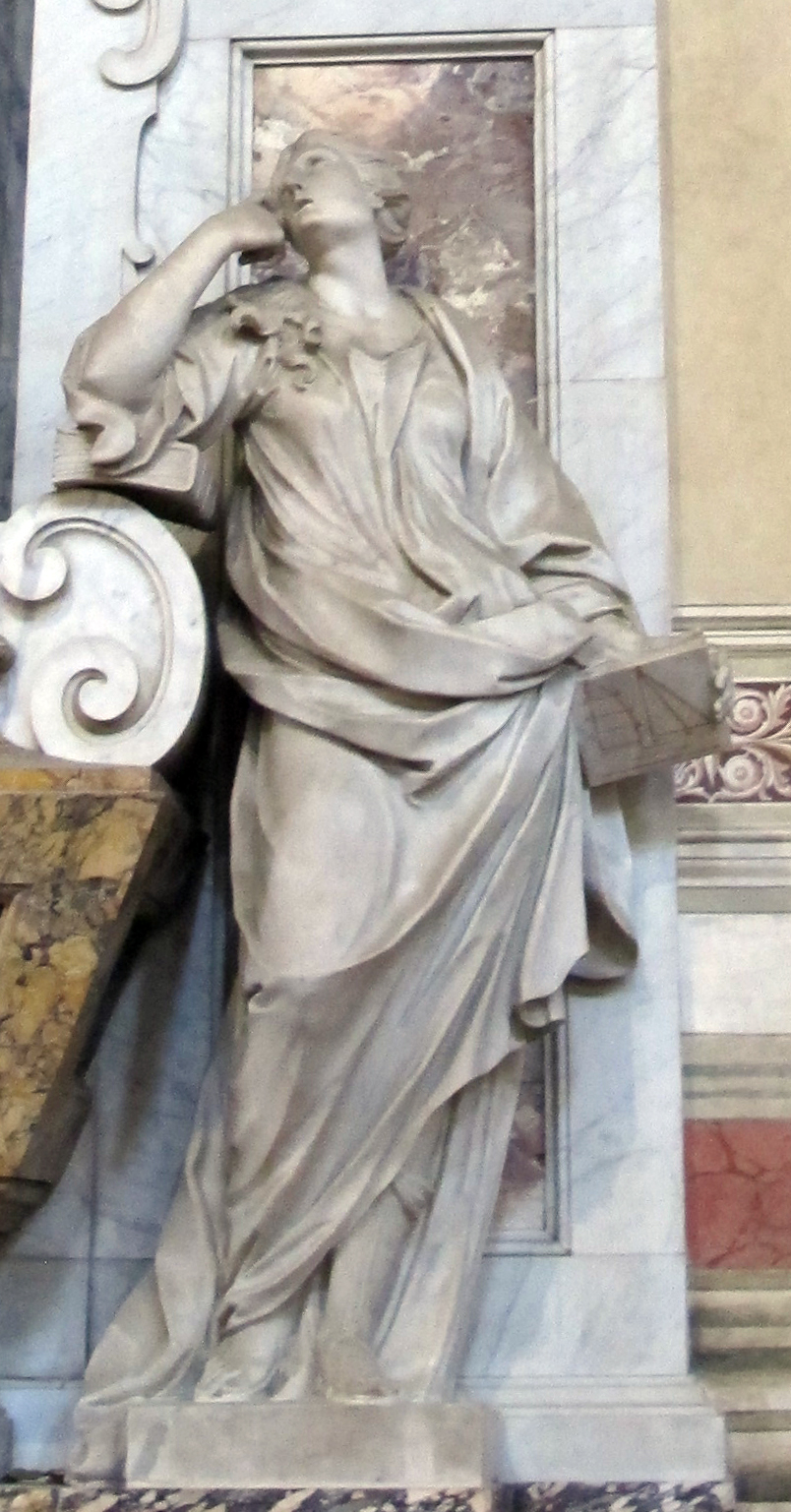
Tomba di galileo, geometria di girolamo ticciati

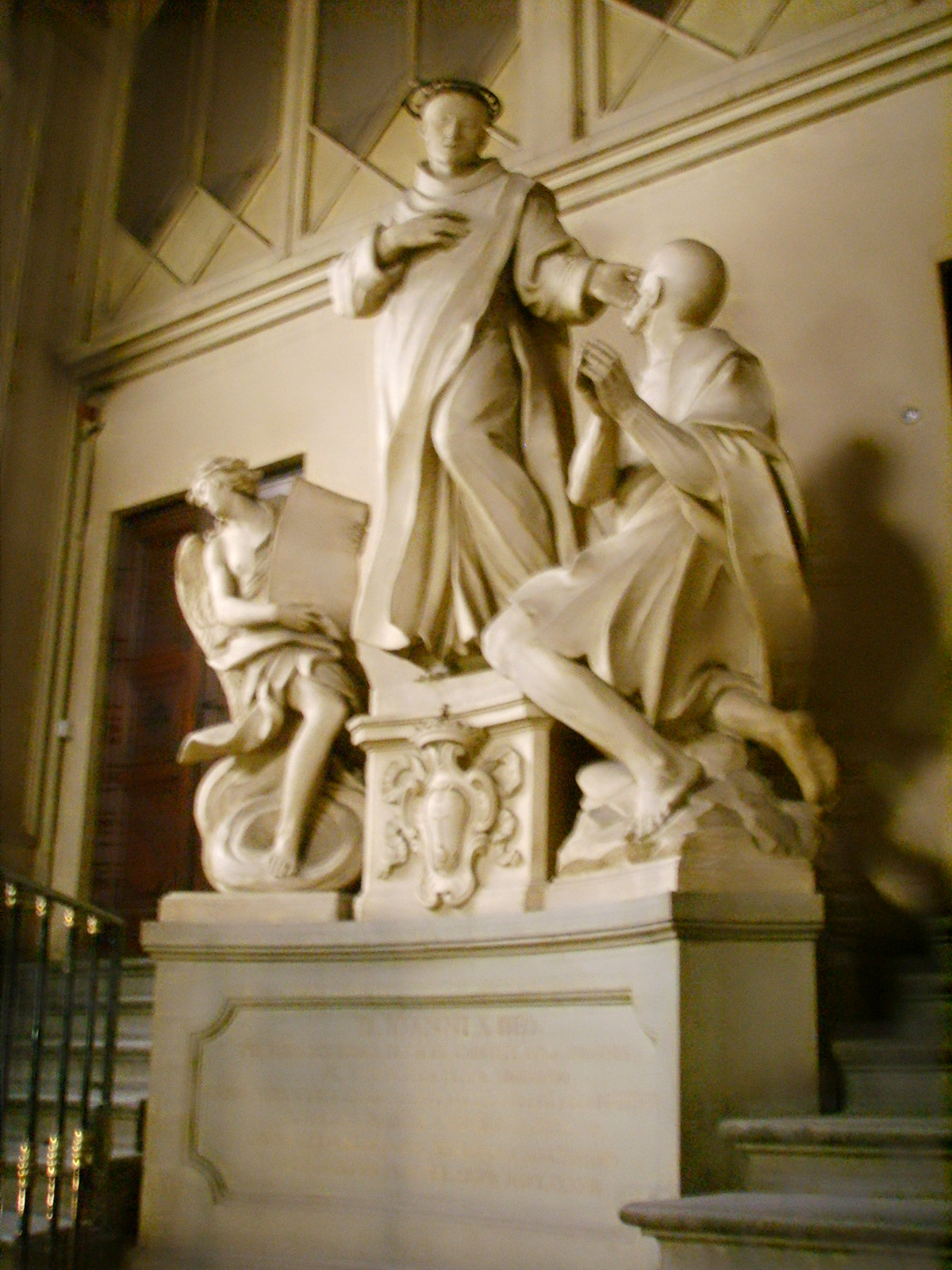
San Giovanni di Dio statua 02
