= Vanessa Latarche =

British pianist

Vanessa Latarche is a British pianist and teacher; she is professor of piano at the Royal College of Music, London.

== Early life and education ==
Latarche studied piano at the Royal College of Music under Kendall Taylor. She furthered her studies in the United States and Paris with Claude Franck and Vlado Perlemuter.

== Career ==
=== Performance ===
Latarche has performed in Europe, the USA, and Eastern Asia, as well as at various UK festivals, including Cheltenham, Harrogate, and Huddersfield. Notably, she performed the complete 48 Preludes and Fugues by Bach at the Lichfield International Festival in 1992. She has played as a soloist with orchestras such as the Royal Liverpool Philharmonic Orchestra, BBC Concert Orchestra, and BBC Welsh Symphony Orchestra and Bournemouth Sinfonietta. She has been a Steinway Artist and has broadcast on BBC Radio 3, the BBC World Service, and BBC Radio 4 for over 30 years.

=== Teaching and Leadership ===
Latarche began her teaching career at the Royal Academy of Music, where she was a professor for 14 years and became an Honorary Associate in 1997. She joined the Royal College of Music in 2005 as Head of Keyboard. In 2010, she was awarded a Fellowship of the RCM for outstanding services to music. In 2011, she was appointed Chair of International Keyboard Studies. She also serves as the Associate Director for Partnerships in Asia, managing the RCM's collaborative projects in China and degree programs at the Nanyang Academy of Fine Arts in Singapore.

=== Jury and Advisory Roles ===
Latarche has served as a juror and jury chair for international piano competitions in various countries, including China, Poland, Russia, Kazakhstan, Serbia, Italy, New Zealand and the US. She has adjudicated the national keyboard final of the BBC Young Musician. In 2007 she was an advisor to the BBC TV programme ‘Classical Star’. She is the Artistic Director of Hastings International Piano Competition. She has been an advisor to Lang Lang Music World in Shenzhen, China, from its inception and is now the Artistic Advisor to the Lang Lang International Music Foundation.

=== Masterclasses and Academic Contributions ===
Latarche frequently conducts masterclasses at institutions such as the Hong Kong Academy for the Performing Arts, Shanghai Conservatory of Music, Beijing Central Conservatory, China Conservatory, Tokyo College of Music, Moscow Tchaikovsky State Conservatory and Seoul National University. She also teaches at UK conservatories and international summer schools.

=== Governance and Editorial Work ===
Latarche has served multiple terms on the Royal College of Music Council. In January 2023, she was elected as a Court Assistant for the Worshipful Company of Musicians. She is a member of the editorial board of Classical Music Magazine and the Director of the Eileen Rowe Musical Trust.

== Publications ==
Latarche has contributed to the Royal College of Music's publication, Inside the Conservatoire, which is set to be published in 2023.
