= Palazzo Rinuccini =

Coordinates: 43.7689°N 11.2466°E

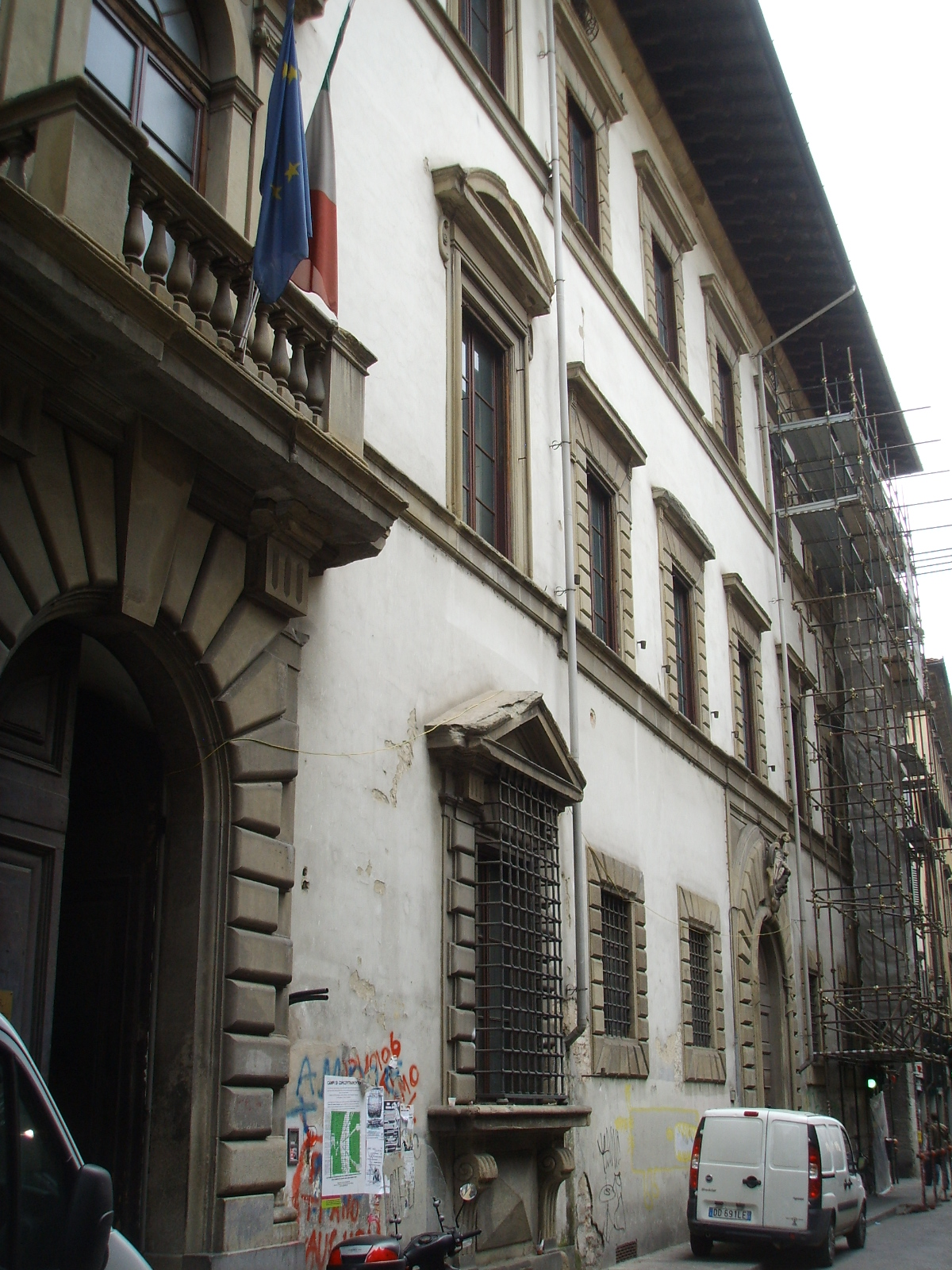
The Palazzo Rinuccini (2008)

The Palazzo Rinuccini is a palace located on Via Santo Spirito #39 in central Florence, region of Tuscany Italy.

== History ==
The palace was designed around 1600 by the architect Ludovico Cardi, and adjacent site was built by Gherardo Silvani. Since the year 2003 the palace houses the Istituto Scolastico di Istruzione Superiore Liceo “Niccolò Machiavelli”.

The palace once housed a prominent art gallery. Remaining are the frescoes by Bernardino Poccetti; Giuseppe Zocchi (Four Seasons); Giuliano Trabellesi; Luigi Catani; Angiolo Sarri; and Niccolò Connestabile (Myth of Niobe). A statue depicting Architecture by Girolamo Ticciati.
