= Santi Vicenzo e Caterina de' Ricci, Prato =

Church in Italy

Chiesa di San Vincenzo and Santa Caterina de' Ricci
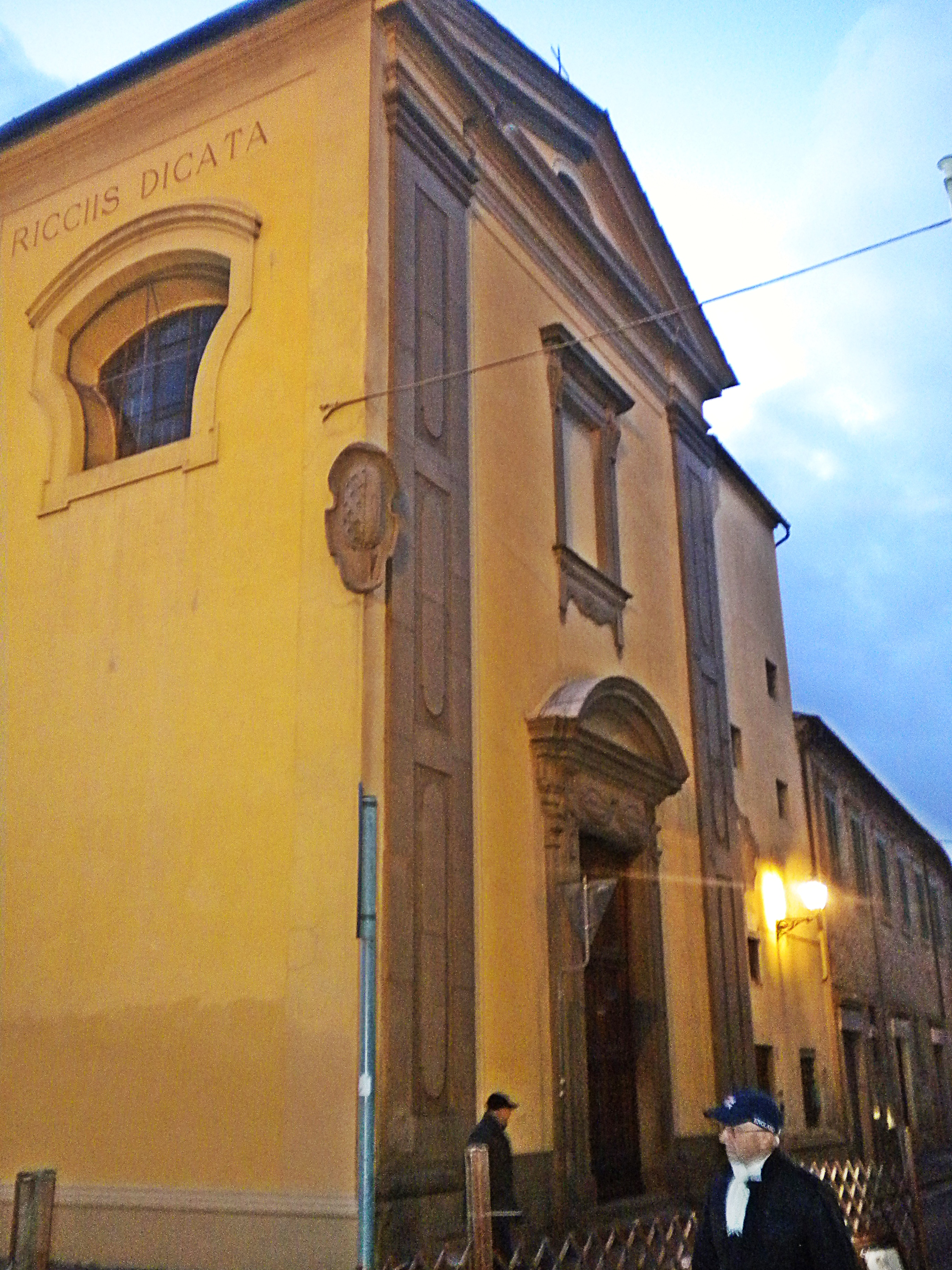
- Facade

Religion
- Affiliation: Roman Catholic

Location
- Location: Prato, Italy
- Interactive map of Chiesa di San Vincenzo and Santa Caterina de' Ricci
- Coordinates: 43°52′55″N 11°05′37″E

Architecture
- Type: Church
- Groundbreaking: 1500 ca.
- Completed: 1700 ca.

The Minor Basilica of Santi Vicenzo e Caterina de' Ricci is a Catholic church, built in the 16th to 18th centuries, and located in the town of Prato, in Tuscany, Italy. Adjacent to the church is a 16th-century monastery.

== Construction ==
The original church of San Vicenzo had been built in the 16th century, but refurbished over the following centuries. The church is now also dedicated to Caterina de' Ricci (1522-1590), who had been a nun associated with the adjacent convent of San Vicenzo Ferrer. About 150 years after her death, Catherine was beatified (1732) and subsequently canonized (1742). After her beatification, this church underwent major refurbishment (1732-1735) under Giovanni Battista Bettini (il Cignaroli) and Girolamo Ticciati. Saint Catherine's remains are displayed under the main altar. The reconstruction and canonization led to making the church a minor basilica. Both the interior and exterior are baroque in style.

== Works of art ==
The church houses a Nativity (16th century) by Michele delle Colombe, a marble relief of Madonna and Child (15th century) by Matteo Civitali, and the Martyrdom of Saint Catherine of Alessandria by Vincenzo Meucci. On the wall of the nave and above the altar is a series of framed relief sculptures by Girolamo Ticciati and Vicenzo Foggini (died 1755), son of the better-known sculptor Giovanni Battista Foggini, depicting various miracles associated with Saint Catherine. The ceiling canvases are by Pucci.

== Adjacent monastery ==
Next to the church is the cloistered monastery founded in 1503 and later expanded during the life of Caterina de’ Ricci. The atrium leads to the Papalini Madonna Chapel. Legends hold that the chapel houses a 16th-century maiolica bust that caused the Spanish troops of Ferdinand II of Aragon and Pope Julius II to spare the monastery during the 1512 Sack of Prato. The altar has two panels depicting and Assumption and Scenes from the Passion (circa 1576) by Michele delle Colombe; it also houses precious paintings by Simone Pignoni (Saints Catherine and Tecla); Lorenzo Lippi (St Francis di Sales); Ridolfo del Ghirlandaio (Madonna and Child); as well from the studio of Giovanni Battista Naldini. There is an altarpiece by Michele Tosini in the garden of the Chapel of Madonna di Loreto. Some sites in the convent are closed to visitors.

== Images ==
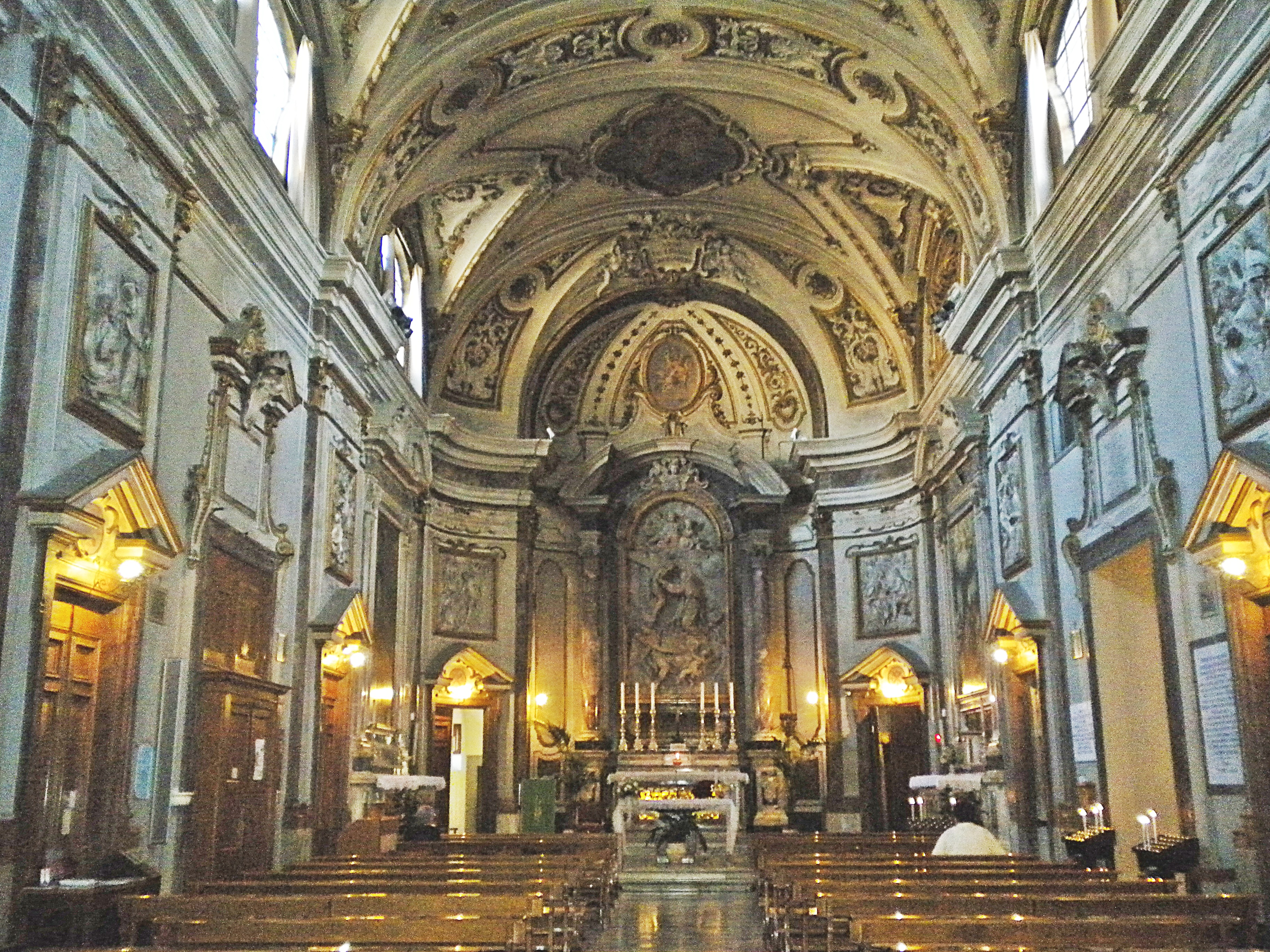
Internal view

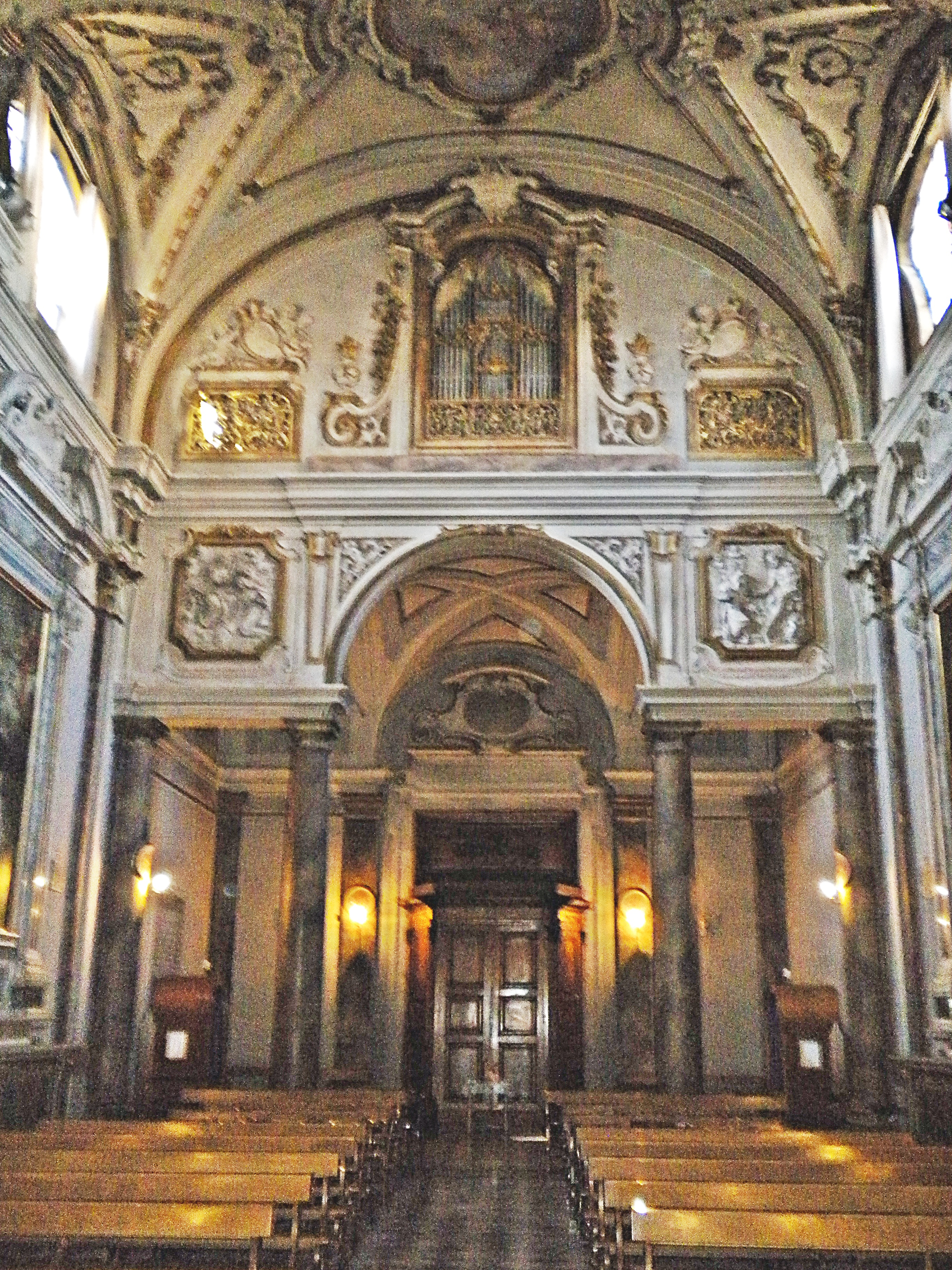
The choir of the nuns

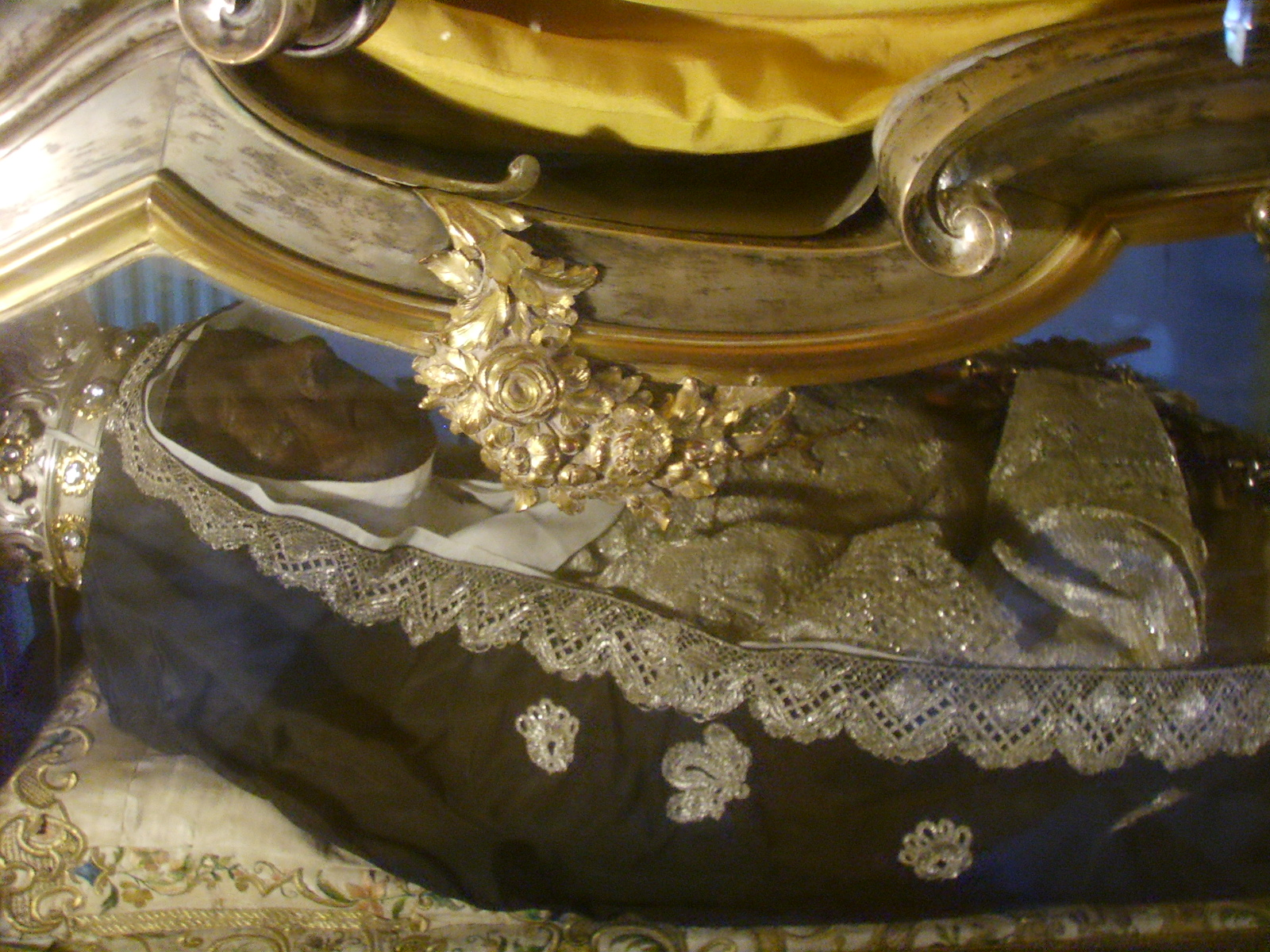
The preserved corpse of Saint Catherine de' Ricci

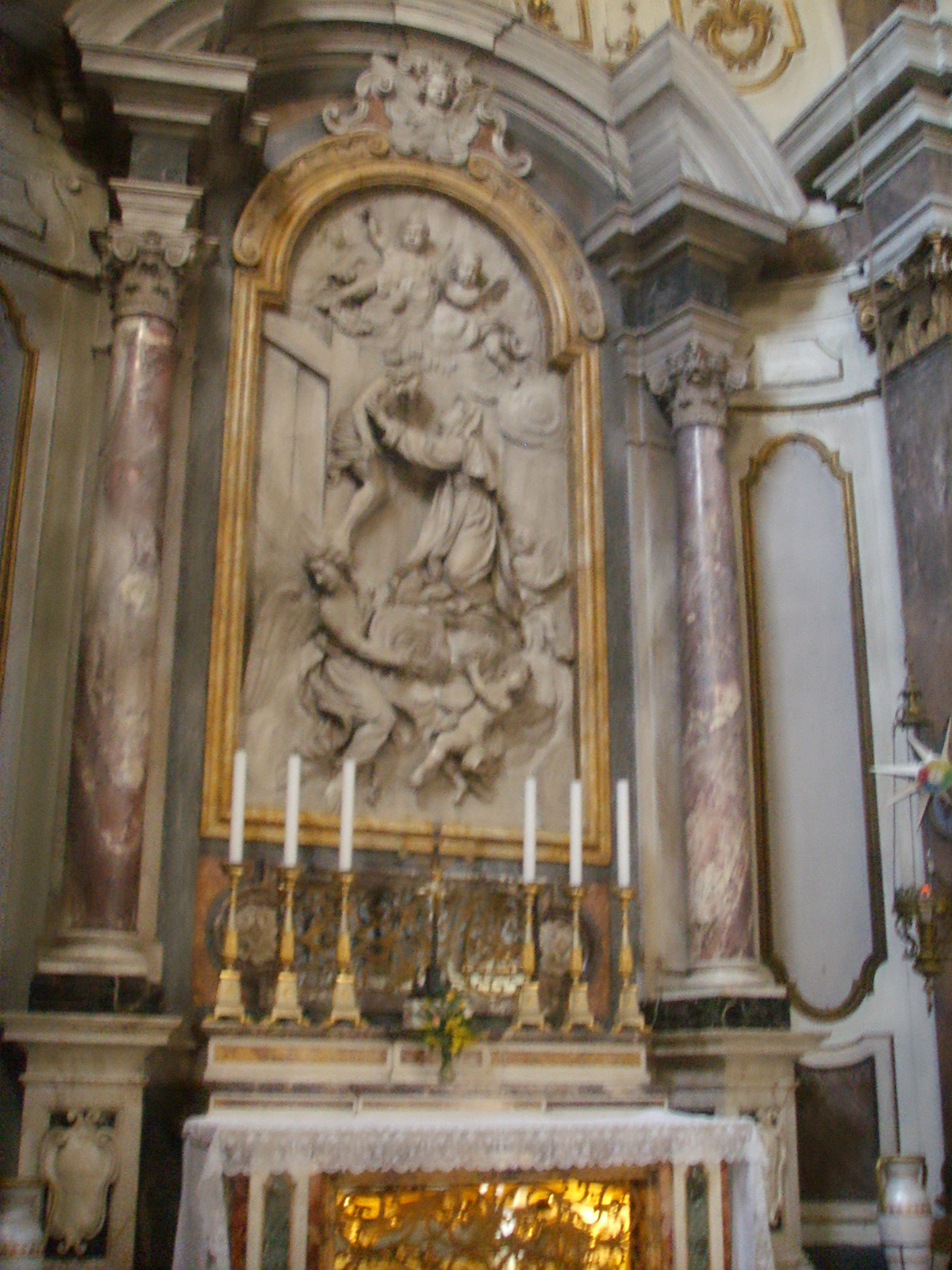
High Altar
