= Catherine de' Ricci =

Italian Dominican cloistered tertiary and saint

Saint Catherine de' Ricci OP
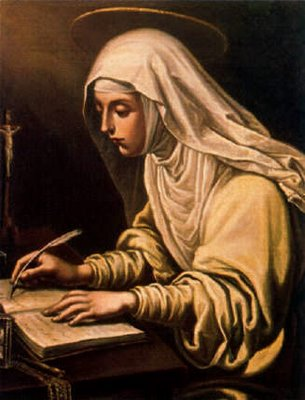

Virgin
- Born: 23 April 1522; Florence, Republic of Florence
- Died: 2 February 1590 (aged 67); Prato, Grand Duchy of Tuscany
- Venerated in: Roman Catholic Church
- Beatified: 23 November 1732, Rome, Papal States by Pope Clement XII
- Canonized: 29 June 1746, Rome, Papal States by Pope Benedict XIV
- Major shrine: Basilica dei Santi Vincenzo e Caterina de' Ricci, Prato, Italy
- Feast: 2 February (changed in 1971 from 13 February)
- Attributes: Dominican habit, quill, white lily

Catherine de' Ricci, OP (Italian: Caterina de' Ricci) (23 April 1522 – 2 February 1590), was an Italian nun in the Third Order of Saint Dominic. She is believed to have had miraculous visions and corporeal encounters with Jesus Christ. She is also said to have spontaneously bled with the wounds of the crucified Christ. She is known for her mystic visions and is venerated as a saint by the Catholic Church.

== Life ==
She was born Alessandra Lucrezia Romola de' Ricci in the Manelli Palace in Florence to Pier Francesco de' Ricci, of a patrician banking family, and his wife, Caterina Bonza, who died soon after. At age 6 or 7, her father enrolled her in a school run by the Benedictine nuns of San Pietro de Monticelli near their home, where Alessandra's aunt, Luisa de' Ricci, was the abbess. There she developed a lifelong devotion to the Passion of Christ.

After a short time outside the monastery, at the age of thirteen she entered the Convent of St Vincent in Prato, Tuscany, a cloistered community of the Third Order of St. Dominic. They were disciples of the noted Dominican friar Girolamo Savonarola, who followed the strict regimen of life she desired. In May 1535 she received the religious habit from the hands of her uncle, Timoteo de' Ricci, who was confessor to the convent, and the religious name Catherine, the name of her deceased mother.

De' Ricci's novitiate was a time of trial. She is reported to have experienced visions of Mary and the Christ child. She would experience ecstasies during her routine, which caused her to lose sleep and seem dull during community prayer services, and clumsy dropping plates and food, so much so that the community began to question her competence, if not her sanity. Eventually the other sisters became aware of the spiritual basis for her behavior. By the age of 25 Catherine had been elected prioress.

As prioress, de' Ricci developed into an effective and greatly admired administrator. She was an advisor on various topics to princes, bishops and cardinals. She corresponded with three men who later became popes: Marcello Cervini degli Spannocchi, Ippolito Aldobrandini, and Alessandro Ottaviano de' Medici. Catherine's advice was widely sought; she gave counsel both in person and through exchanging letters. It is reported that she was extremely effective and efficient in her work, managing her priorities very well.

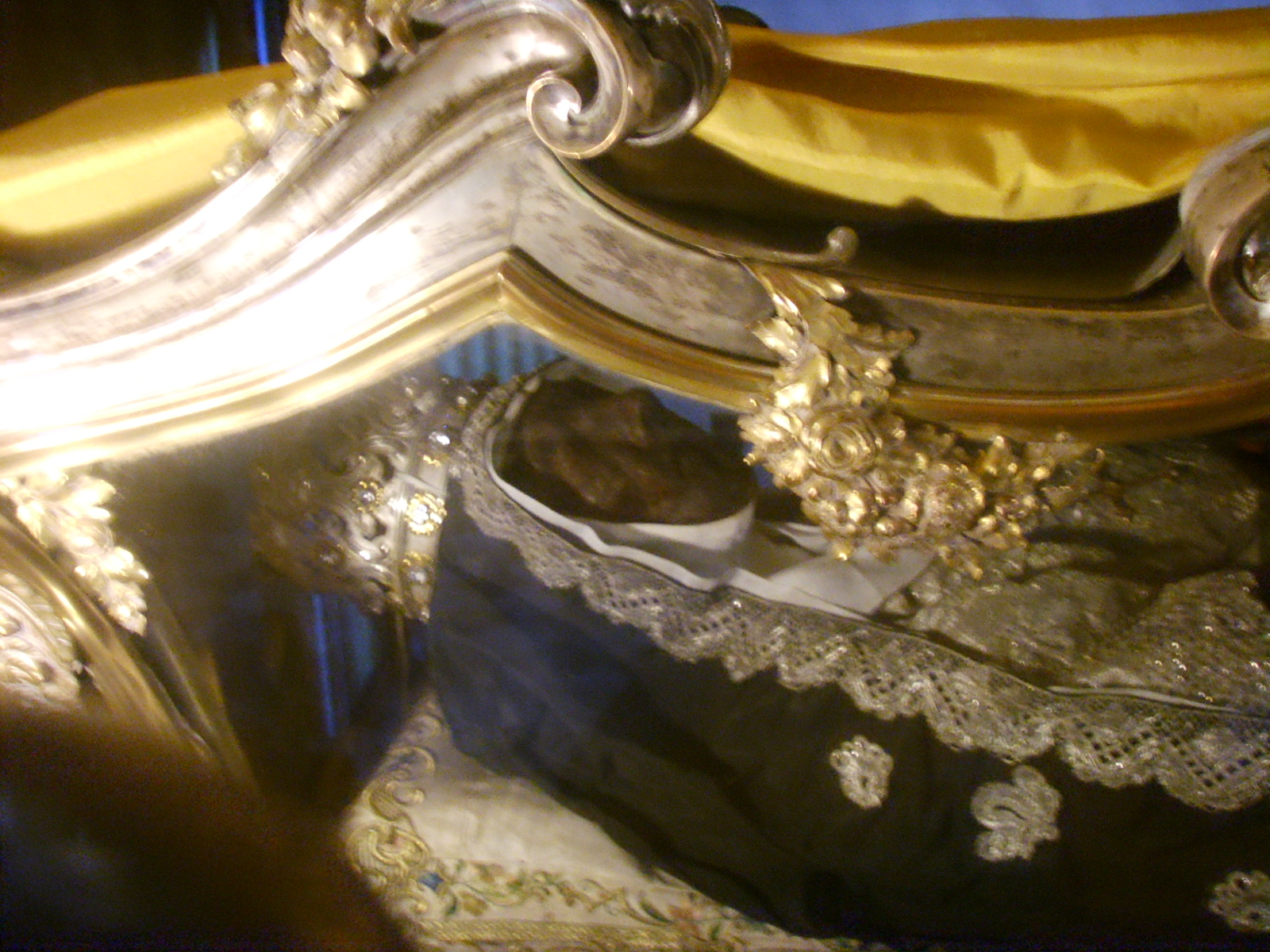
Relics of Catherine de Ricci in the Basilica dei Santi Vincenzo e Caterina de' Ricci

It is claimed that de' Ricci's meditation on the Passion of Christ was so deep that she spontaneously bled, as if scourged and bore the stigmata. During times of deep prayer, like Catherine of Siena, her patron saint, a ring-shaped stigm, representing her marriage to Christ, appeared on her finger.

It is reported that de' Ricci wore an iron chain around her neck and engaged in extreme fasting and other forms of penance and sacrifice, especially for souls in purgatory.

One of the miracles that was documented for her canonization was her appearance many hundreds of miles away from where she was physically located in a vision to Philip Neri, a resident of Rome, with whom she had maintained a long-term correspondence. Neri, who was otherwise very reluctant to discuss miraculous events, confirmed the event.

De' Ricci lived in the convent until her death in 1590 after a prolonged illness. Her relics are visible under the altar of the Minor Basilica of Santi Vicenzo e Caterina de' Ricci, Prato.

== Veneration ==
De' Ricci was beatified by Pope Clement XII in 1732, and canonized by Pope Benedict XIV in 1746 in a spectacular ceremony for which a magnificent apparato was constructed. In celebration of the canonization, Domenico Maria Sandrini wrote an authoritative biography of the new saint. Her feast day falls on 13 February. Lucy Eaton Smith named the Dominican congregation founded by her, the Dominican Sisters of St. Catherine de' Ricci, because of her devotion to de' Ricci.

== See also ==
- List of Catholic saints
- Saint Catherine of Ricci, patron saint archive
