= Nicola Contestabili =

Italian painter (1759–1824)

Nicola or Niccolò Contestabili (1759–1824) was an Italian painter, mainly depicting history and landscapes in a Neoclassic style.

== Biography ==
His father Antonio Contestabili was a landscape and quadratura painter. Born in Pontremoli, Nicola moved to Florence in 1778 to study under Francesco Zuccarelli. Nicola also painted the sipario or theater curtain for the Persio Flacco Theater in Volterra. He returned to live in Pontremoli from 1786 to 1802, when he returned to Florence. In Pontremoli, he painted scenes of Niobe and Aurora for the Casa Gramoli. He also painted in Casa Martelli. He died in Florence.
