= Fortezza da Basso =

Fort in Florence, Italy

Coordinates: 43°46′55.05″N 11°14′53.89″E

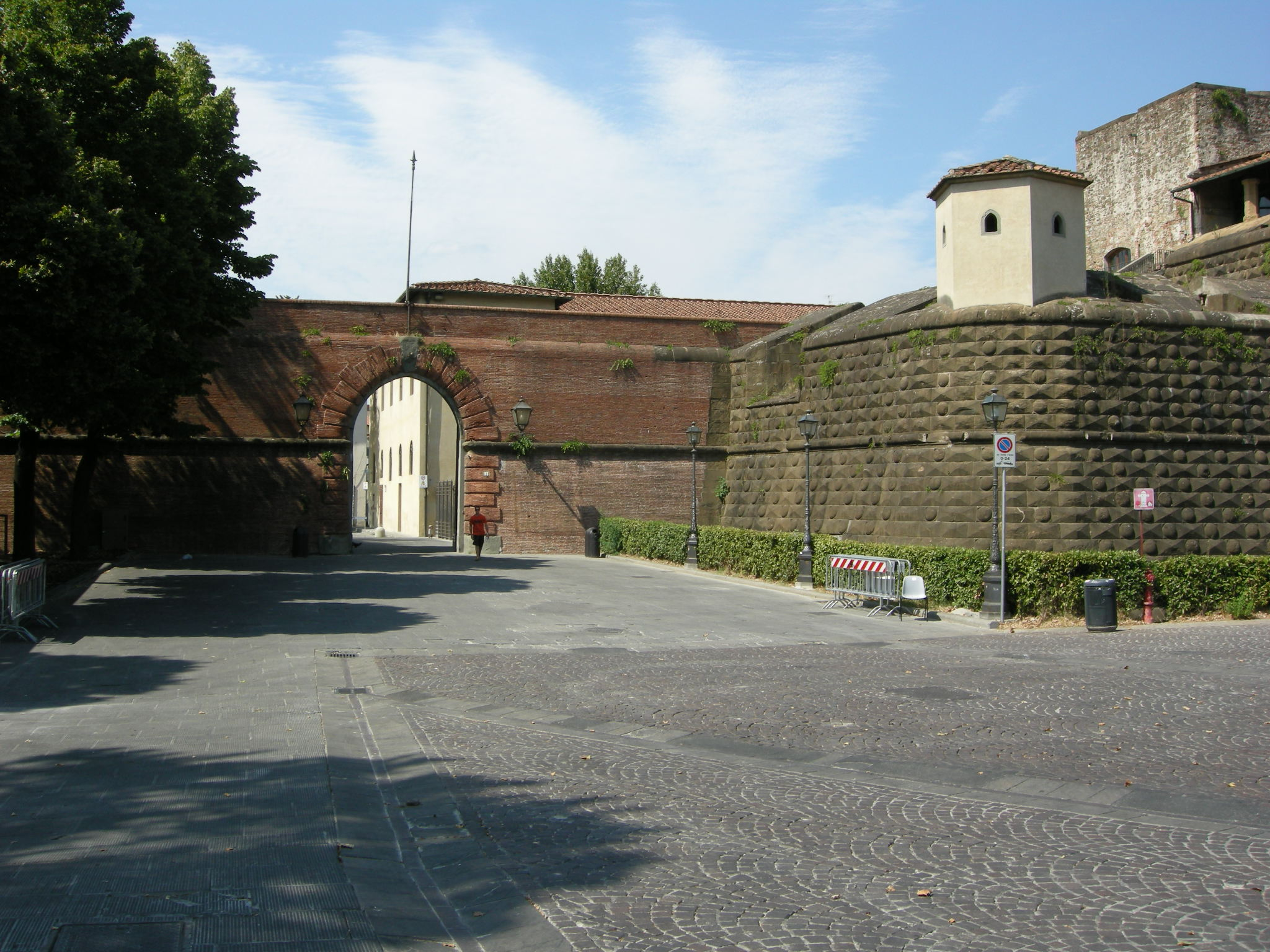
Entrance to the fort

Fortezza da Basso is a fort inserted in the fourteenth century walls of Florence. Its official name is the Fortress of Saint John the Baptist (Fortezza di San Giovanni Battista). In modern times it is home to numerous conferences, concerts and national and international exhibitions, such as Pitti Immagine. Its total area is nearly 100,000 square meters.

== Construction ==
Fortezza da Basso was designed by Antonio da Sangallo the Younger for Alessandro de' Medici, Duke of Florence, also called The Moor, and was built between 1534 and 1537. It is the largest historical monument in Florence.

== Images ==
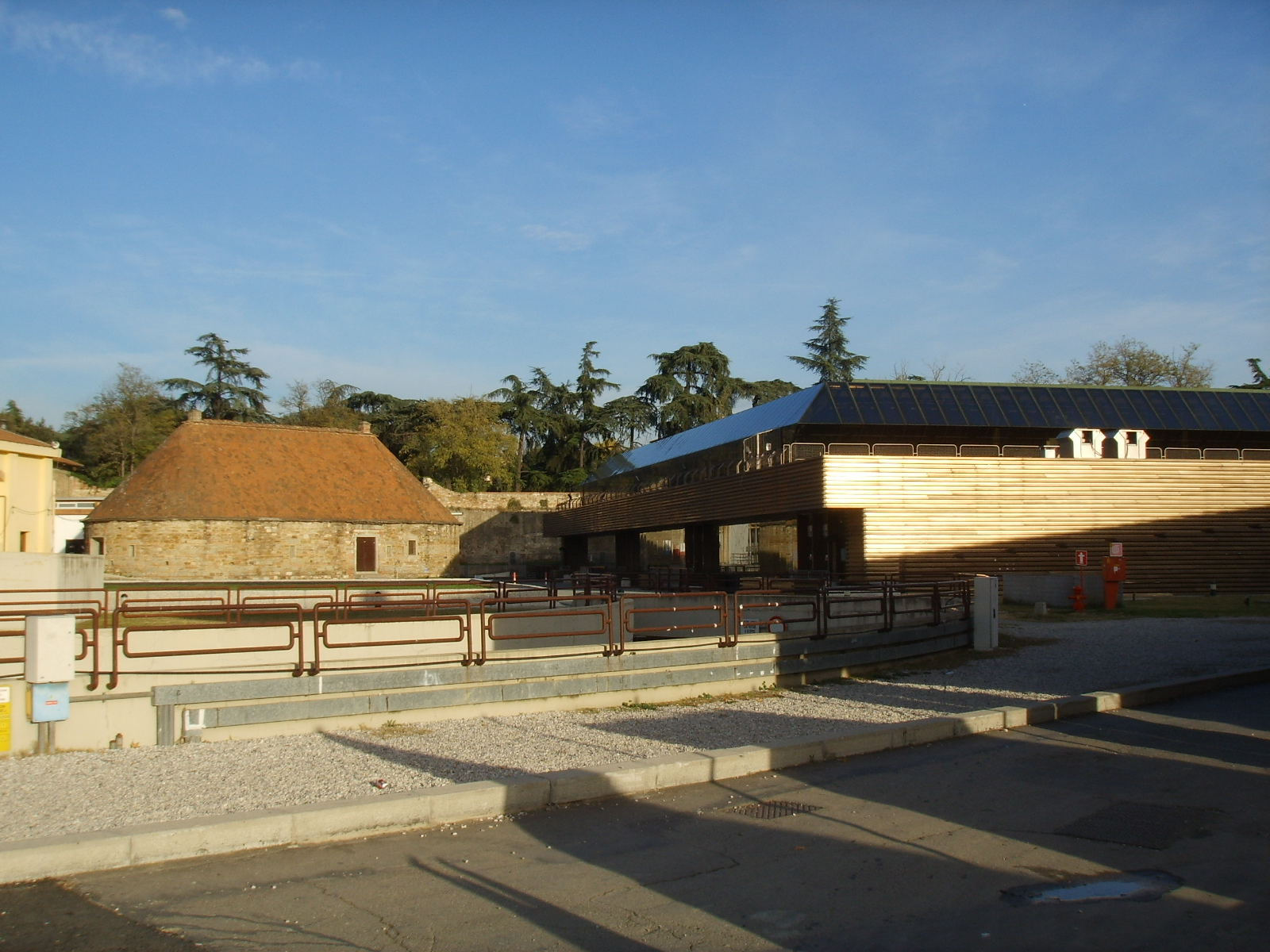

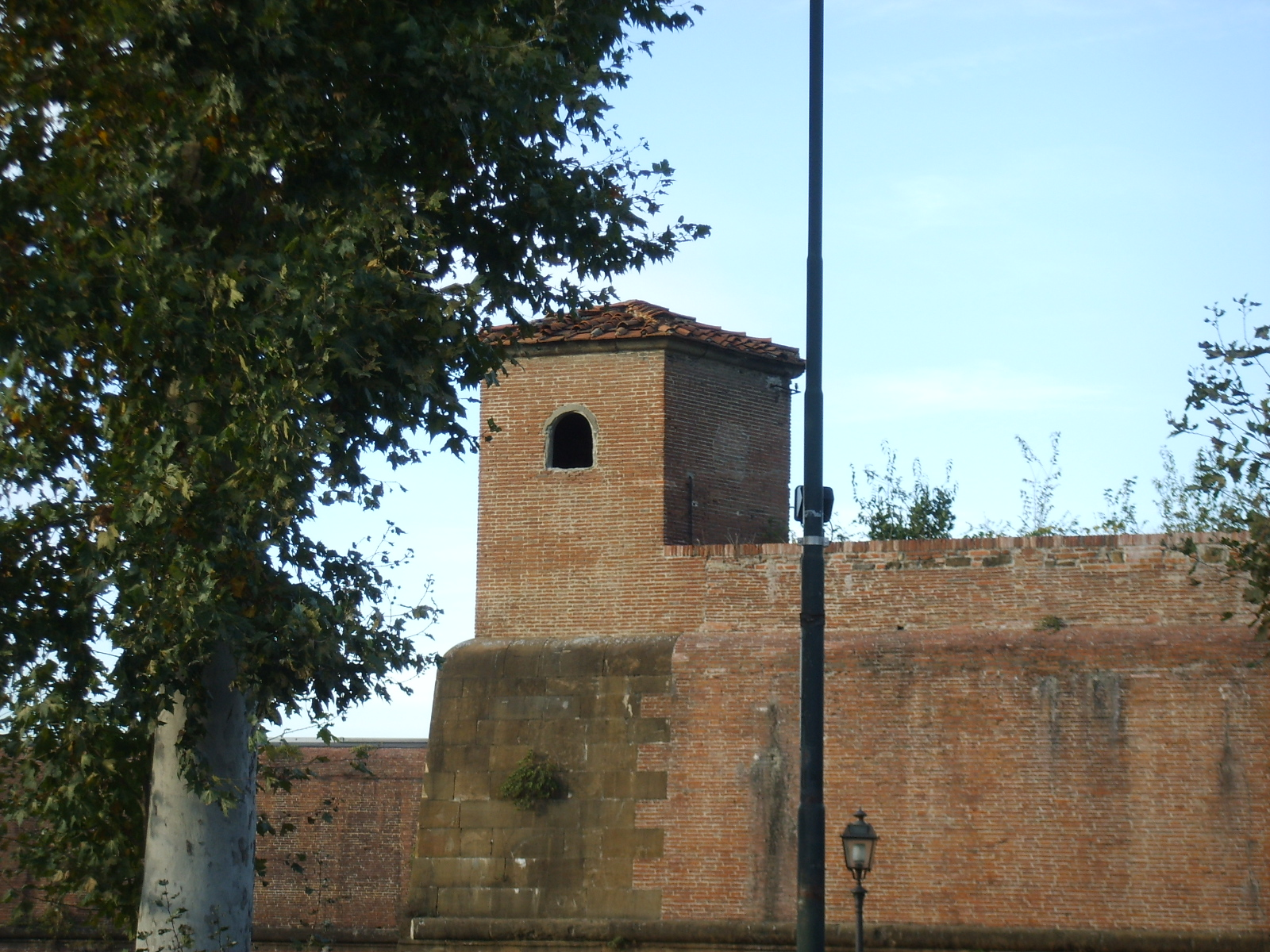

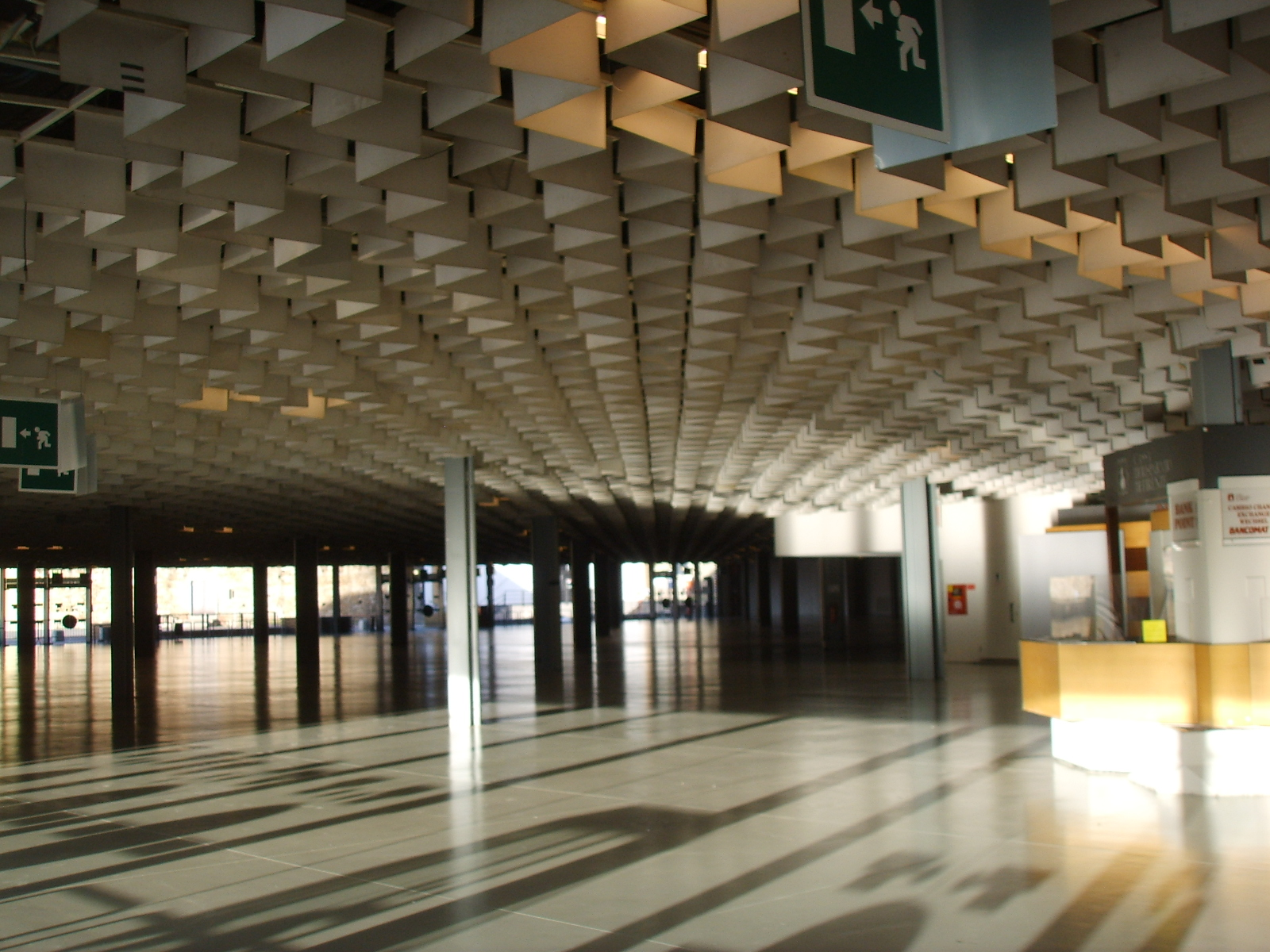

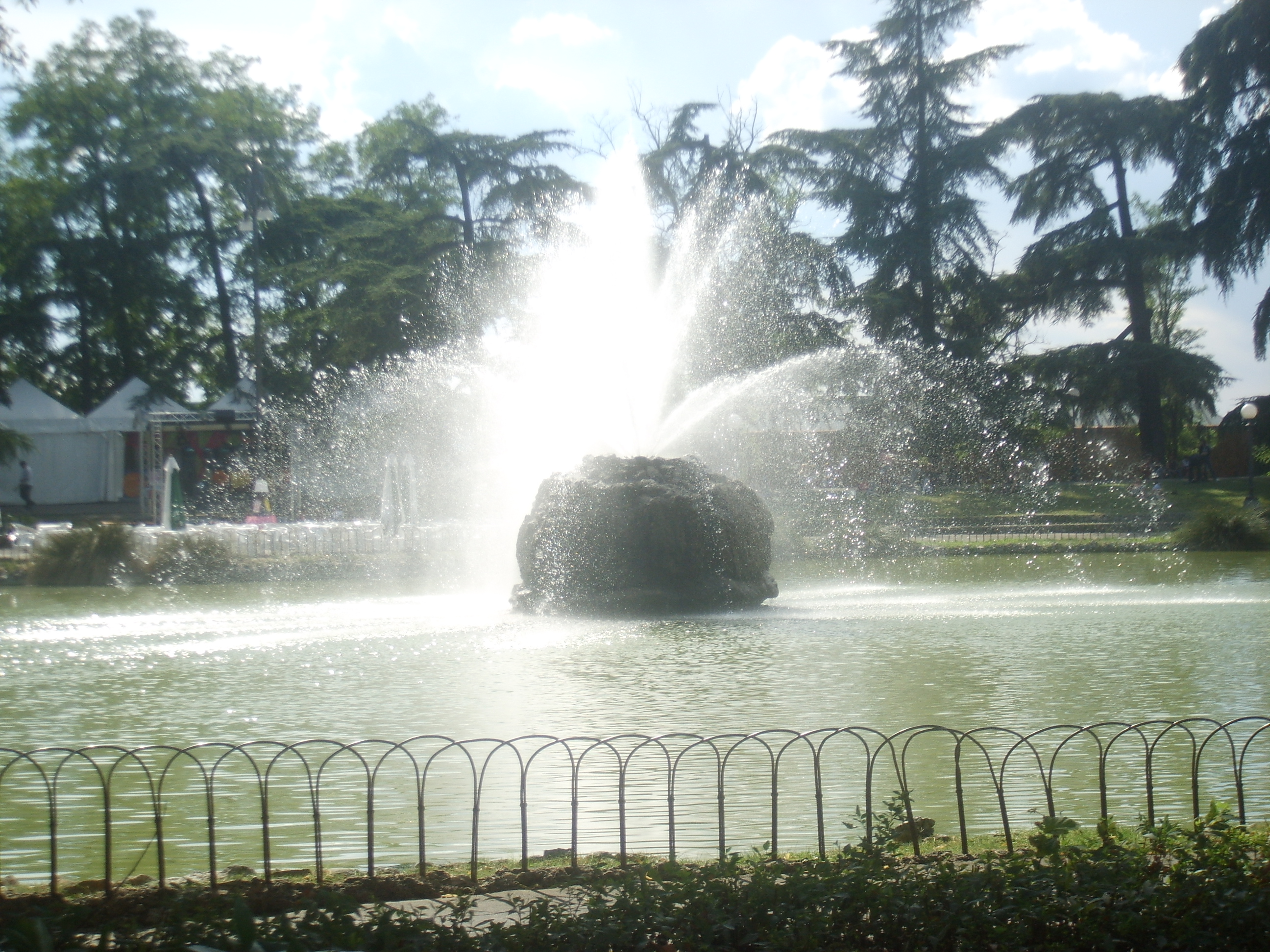

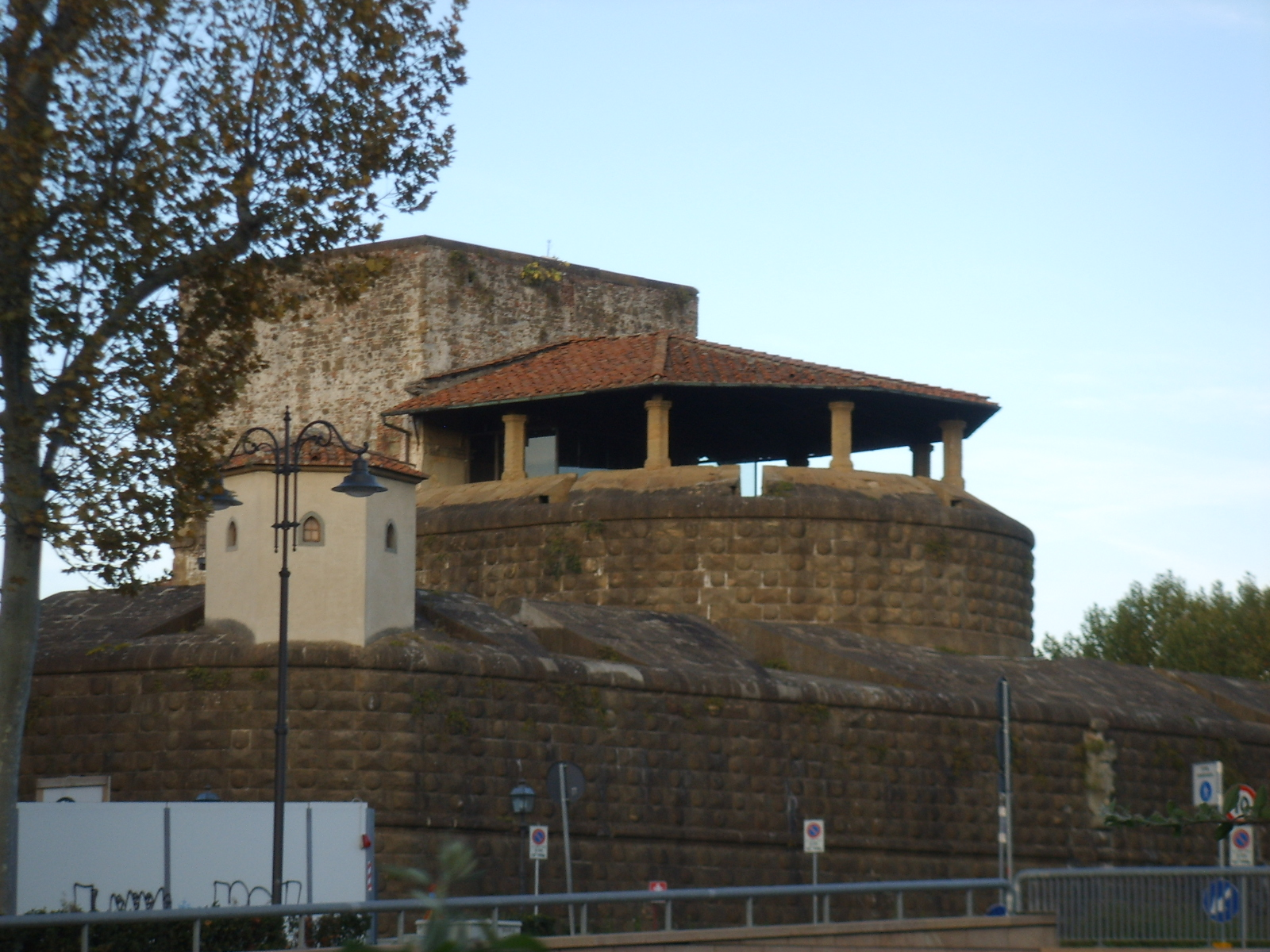
