= Promenade Concert =

Canadian television program

- Genre: Music
- Country of origin: Canada
- Original language: English
- No. of seasons: 4

Production
- Producer: David Marcus-Roland
- Running time: 60 minutes

Original release
- Network: CBC Television
- Release: 28 May 1953 – 13 September 1956

Promenade Concert is a Canadian music television program that aired on CBC Television from 1953 to 1956.

== Premise ==
This program featured the Promenade Concert series in Toronto, recorded at Varsity Arena. These concerts were also broadcast on CBC Radio.

== Scheduling ==
This hour-long program was broadcast as follows (times in Eastern):

Day	Time	Season run	
Thursdays	9:00 p.m.	28 May 1953	4 June 1953
Thursdays	9:30 p.m.	11 June 1953	24 September 1953
Sundays	11:00 a.m.	6 June 1954	13 June 1954
Thursdays	8:30 p.m.	1 July 1954	23 September 1954
Sundays	3:30 p.m.	12 June 1955	26 June 1955
Thursdays	8:30 p.m.	7 July 1955	15 September 1955
Thursdays	8:30 p.m.	7 June 1956	13 September 1956
