= Rinuccini =

Rinuccini is a surname, and may refer to:

- Giovanni Battista Rinuccini (1592–1653), an Italian archbishop.
- Ottavio Rinuccini (1562–1621), an Italian poet and librettist.
- Alamanno Rinuccini, an Italian author who wrote On Liberty.
