= Hugo Ticciati =

British-born violinist, living in Sweden (born 1980)

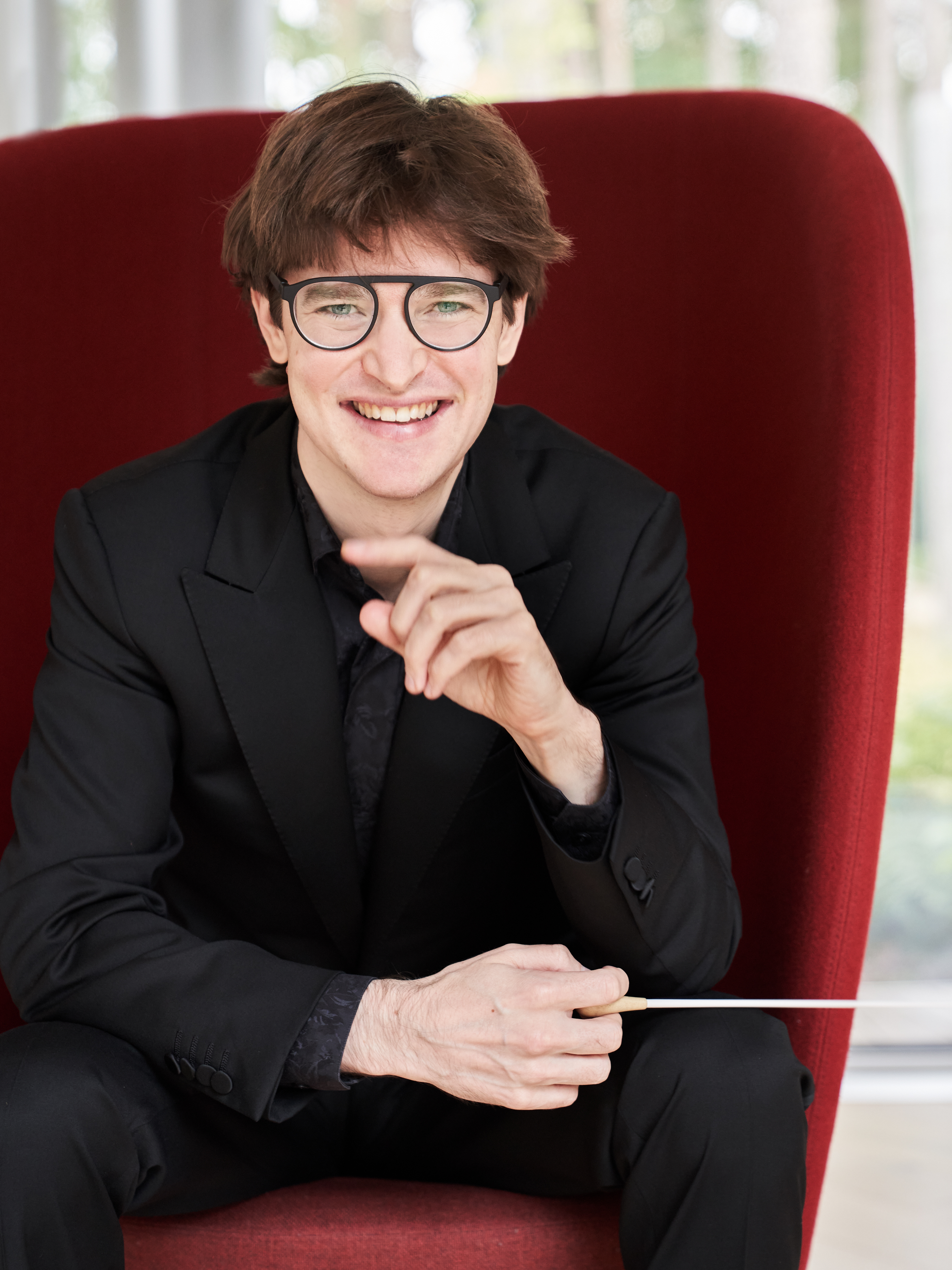
Hugo Ticciati

Hugo Ticciati (born 1980) is a British-born violinist and conductor of Italian origin, living in Sweden. He has performed in several worldwide events such as the Gotland Chamber Music Festival (Sweden), the Saint-Denis Festival (Paris), and the Festival Internacional Cervantino. He also founded his own festival, called O/MODƏRNT, in Sweden in 2011.

== Career ==
At the age of twelve, he entered the Edinburgh Festival at Queen Elizabeth Hall. Since then, Ticciati has performed with several orchestras from England, Romania, Sweden, East Asia, Estonia, and the United States. He has performed in the Baltic Sea Festival in Sweden, at Carnegie Hall, and the Hermitage Music Festival held in St Petersburg. Ticciati currently gives regular concerts in important halls in Europe and in East Asia. He plays accompanied by pianists such as Staffan Scheja, Svetlana Navarssadian, Sophia Rahman, Michael Tsalka and Henrik Måwe.

Ticciati gives masterclasses and seminars on violin teaching and lectures on music-related subjects all over the world. In the autumn of 2008, he served as a guest violin teacher and lecturer in music history at The New School in New York. Hugo's teaching searches for ways to apply the physical and spiritual aspects of meditation to practicing art, playing, and living in music.

Ticciati started studying violin in London before attending the University of Toronto. He continued studying with Russian violinists Nina and Oleg Balabina in Sweden, where he is now a citizen. Ticciati has won the international competitions Giovani Talenti and Rovere d'Oro at San Bartolomeo al Mare, Italy, in 2002, and the Mendelssohn Cup in Bari, Italy, in 2004. In 2007, he was admitted as a Fellow of the Royal Schools of Music in the United Kingdom.

== Projects ==
Ticciati has started a new festival named O/Modernt (stylized as "O/Modərnt") as artistic director at Ulrikdals Palace Theatre Confidencen, in Sweden.

Ticciati works in the contemporary music world with composers such as Albert Schnelzer, Anders Hillborg, Djuro Zivkovic, Leonardo Coral, Andrea Tarrodi, Tobias Broström, Thomas Jennefelt, Sergei Yevtushenko and Esaias Järnegard. Within other projects, he is working with Bill Connor (English composer), on "An Improvised Violin Concerto." Over the next seasons, Ticciati will be performing concertos in Russia, Romania, Sweden, England and Mexico.

== Music festivals ==
Ticciati has been invited to several renowned musical events, such as the Gotland Chamber Music Festival (Sweden), the Saint-Denis Festival (Paris), and the Festival Internacional Cervantino, which is annually held in Guanajuato, Mexico. In 2011, Sweden was a guest of honor in FIC and was represented by Angereds Teater, Åke Parmerud, Stockholm Jazz Orchestra, and Hugo Ticciati, who worked with Michael Tsalka.
