= Zambra =

Zambra may refer to:

- Zambra (dance), style of flamenco dancing originating in Spain
- Zambra, Cascina, village in Cascina comune, Province of Pisa, Tuscany, Italy
- Zambra (surname)

== See also ==
- Arhopala zambra, species of butterfly found in Southeast Asia
- Negretti and Zambra, former London-based scientific instruments company
- Villa La Zambra, mansion in Sesto Fiorentino, Metropolitan City of Florence, Tuscany, Italy
