= Zambra (surname) =

Zambra is a surname. Notable people with the surname include:

- Alejandro Zambra, Chilean poet and novelist
- Joseph Warren Zambra, photographer and maker of scientific instruments
- Stephanie Zambra (born 1989), Irish football striker
- Tamara Olga Acosta Zambra, Chilean actress
- Valeska Zambra, Chilean physicist
