= Emilio Barbieri =

Italian architect

Emilio Barbieri (March 1862 in Sesto Fiorentino – ?) was an Italian architect.

He studied at the Scuole Tecniche, and at the Accademia of Florence, where he became professor of architectural design. In 1886, he won an academic contest for designing a Civic Theater for a town of 40,000 inhabitants. In Florence, he designed a home for signor Angelo Bondi on via Machiavelli, and for doctor Bruns in via Pier Capponi. In 1867–1869, as Applied Architect of the Ministry of the Royal Household ("Architetto Applicato al Ministero della Regia Casa") he designed the building of the "Pagliere" (Hay House, for feeding horses) adjacent to the Royal Stables. These are still found adjacent to (or encompassed by) the Boboli Gardens, at the intersections of Via della Pace e del Mascherino, Viale Machiavelli, and Porta Romana in Florence. The airy building later was used for art studios, and became part of the Art Institute, and Museum of the Figurative Arts of the 20th century. Barbieri also had carved monuments sent to United States.

== Note ==
- Another Emilio Barbieri (Mezzana, October 8, 1848 – Pisa, June 9, 1899) was a 19th-century Italian Baritone singer.
