= La Serena, Chile =

La Serena
- City and Commune
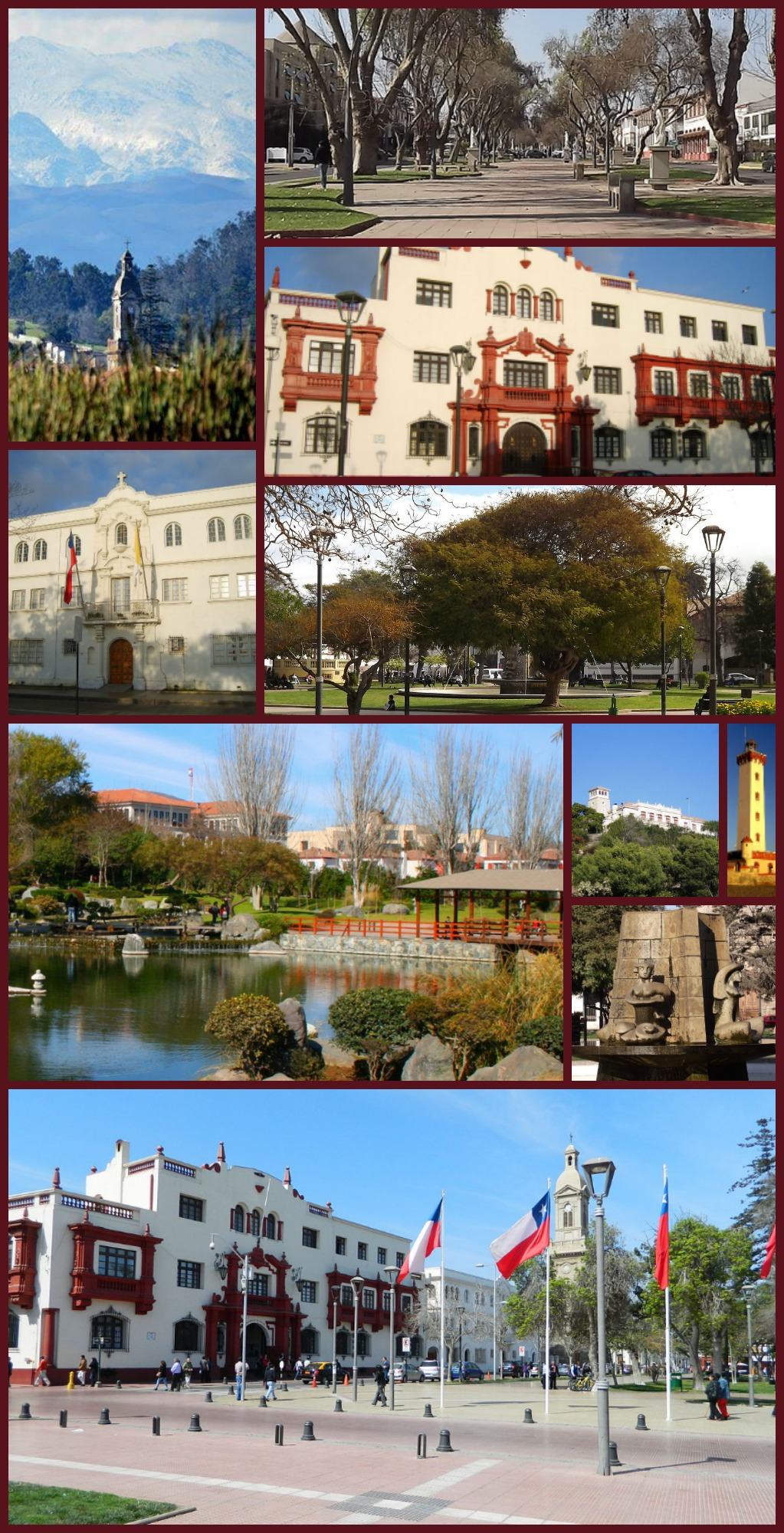
- Archbishopric of La Serena, Court of Appeals, Landscape, Japanese Park, Plaza de Armas, Lighthouse, Avenida Francisco de Aguirre, Fountain of the Plaza de Armas, Court and the Plaza and University of La Serena (Campus Colina El Pino)

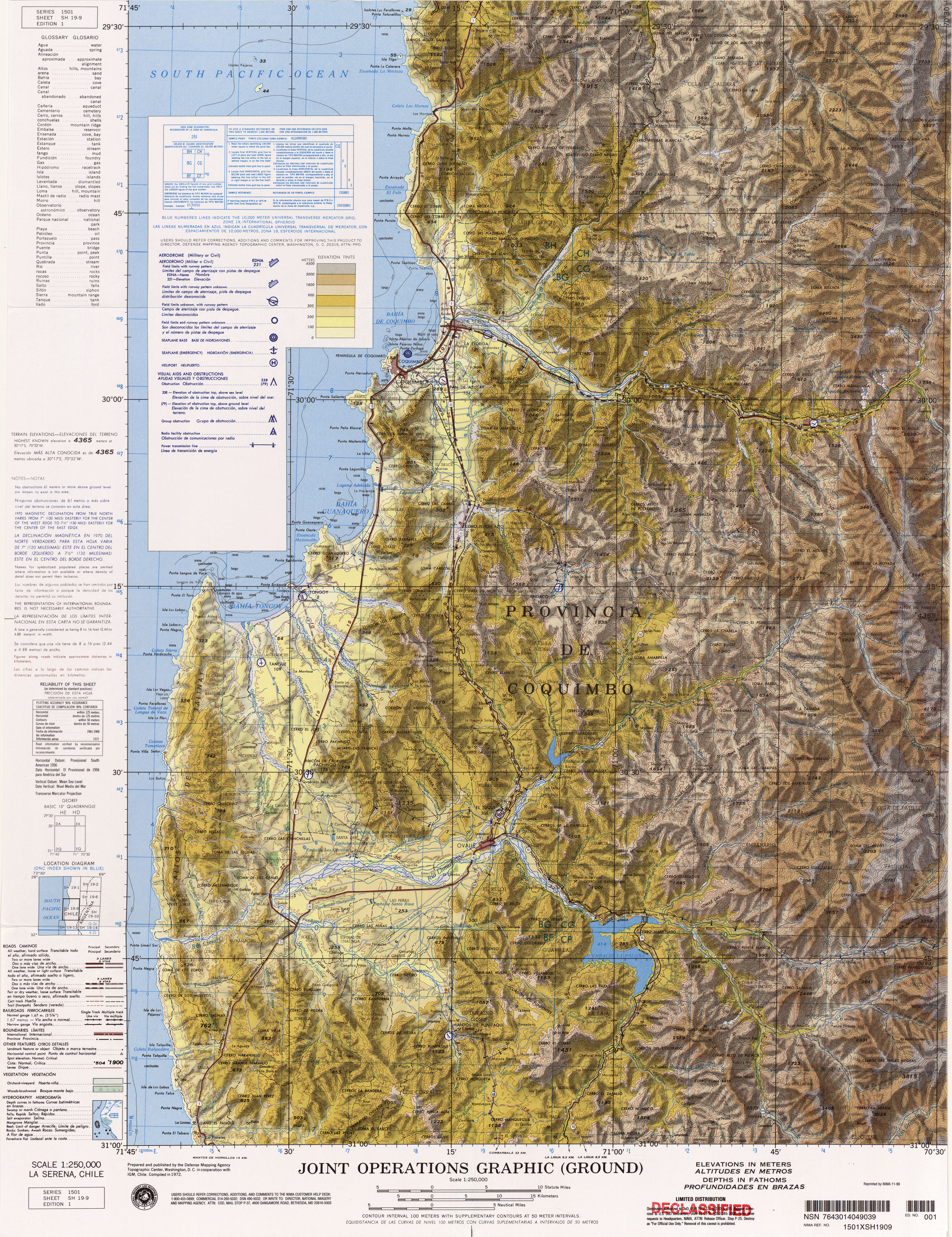
- Flag Coat of arms La Serena's urban hinterland Location in Chile
- Coordinates (city): 29°54′S 71°15′W
- Country: Chile
- Region: Coquimbo
- Province: Elqui
- Founded: 1544
- Named for: La Serena, Spain

Government
  - Type: Municipality
  - Alcalde: Luis Henríquez (a)

Area
  - City: 1,892.8 km^{2} (730.8 sq mi)
- Elevation: 28 m (92 ft)

Population (2024)
  - City: 250,141
  - Density: 132.15/km^{2} (342.28/sq mi)
  - Urban: 401,938
  - Metro: 513,000
- Demonym: Serenean
- Time zone: UTC−4 (CLT)
  - Summer (DST): UTC−3 (CLST)
- Postal code: 1700000
- Climate: BWk
- Website: www.laserena.cl (in Spanish)

La Serena (Spanish pronunciation: [la seˈɾena]) is a city and commune in northern Chile, capital of the Coquimbo Region. Founded in 1544, it is the country's second oldest city after the national capital, Santiago. As of 2024, it has a communal population of 250,141, and is one of the fastest-growing cities in Chile.

The city is an important tourist destination for Chileans and Argentines, especially during the summer, where people go to visit the beaches. It is the headquarters of the University of La Serena and also is home to the Roman Catholic Archdiocese of La Serena, one of five Catholic Archdioceses of the Catholic Church in Chile.

== History ==
The sector is currently located where the city was inhabited by the pre-Hispanic village called Viluma or Vilumanque (Mapudungún Snakes and condors).

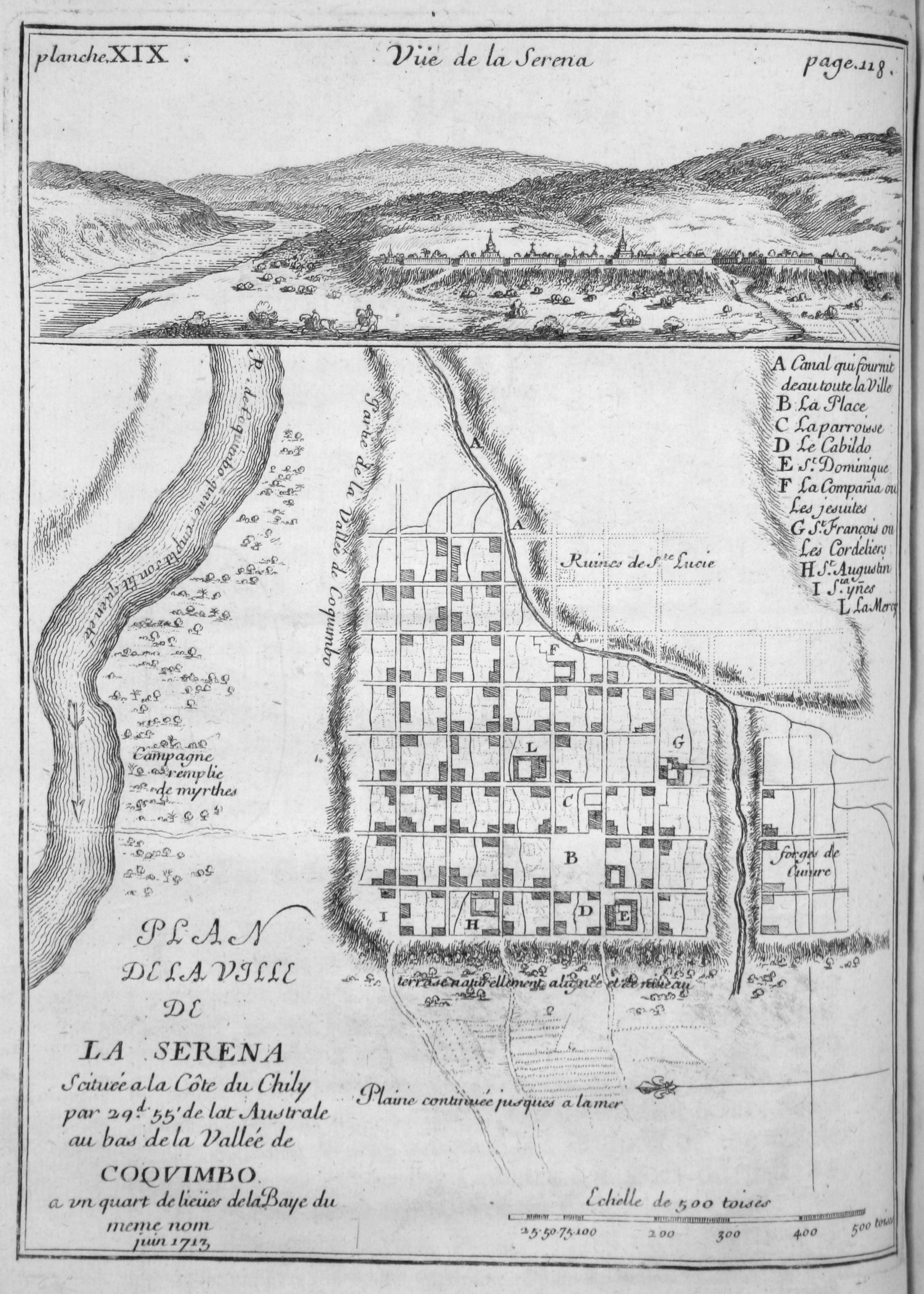
Map of the city in 1717.

La Serena was founded on the orders of the Spaniard Pedro de Valdivia in order to provide a sea link to maintain permanent contact between Santiago and Lima in the Viceroyalty of Peru. For this he would need a place for his troops to rest and eat. The village was founded by captain Juan Bohón with the name "Villanueva de La Serena". Although the exact date is disputed, probable dates include 15 November or 30 December 1543 and 4 September 1544. Many historians simply say that it was founded in 1544. Five years later, from the night of 11 January 1549 until the following day, a native uprising totally destroyed and burned the village, killing nearly every Spaniard. Pedro de Valdivia ordered Captain Francisco de Aguirre to re-establish the city later the same year on 26 August under the name of San Bartolomé de La Serena (now patron saint of the city), in the same place where the Plaza de Armas stands today. A few years later, on 4 May 1552, King Charles I of Spain by royal decree gave it the title of city. One of the reasons to establish La Serena was to control Mapuche groups that had begun to migrate north following the Spanish founding of Santiago in 1541. Indeed, northern Mapuche groups appear to have responded to the Spanish conquest by abandoning their best agricultural lands and moving to remote parts away from the invaders.

During the 17th century, the city suffered repeated attacks from privateers, including Francis Drake who opened the Pacific route to the English in 1578. Bartholomew Sharp, who partly burned and looted in 1680, and Edward Davis, who set fire to the convent of Santo Domingo in 1686, caused great fear among the population, forcing the defence of the city in 1700. In addition to these attacks, the city was almost totally destroyed by the earthquake of 8 July 1730.

With the establishment of Fundición Lambert around 1840 La Serena became one of the first localities in Chile to be "reached" by the Industrial Revolution. The said copper smelter produced together with the copper smelter in Lirquén in total a third of Chile's copper bars in 1846.

During the Revolution of 1859, a rebellion against the conservative government, the city was taken by forces led by Pedro León Gallo. Gallo's forces were defeated at the Battle of Cerro Grande by an army from Santiago, which then occupied the city.

== Geography ==
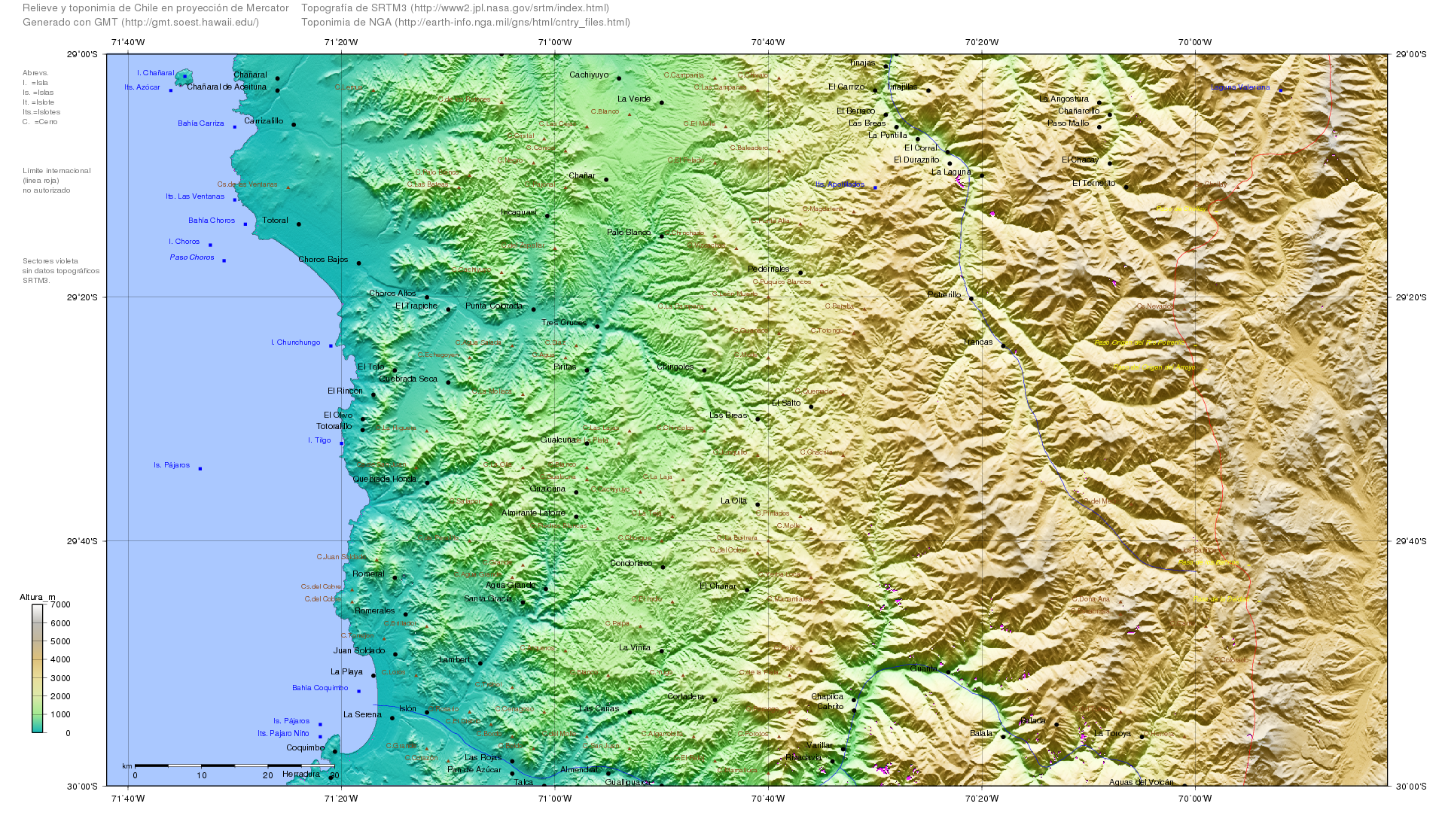

The commune spans a surface area of 1,892.8 km^{2} (731 sq mi). The city is located on ocean terraces, which are clearly noticeable from the coastal area, through downtown to the eastern sector Vicuña way. The rest of the urban area is based on several small hills, valleys and plains.

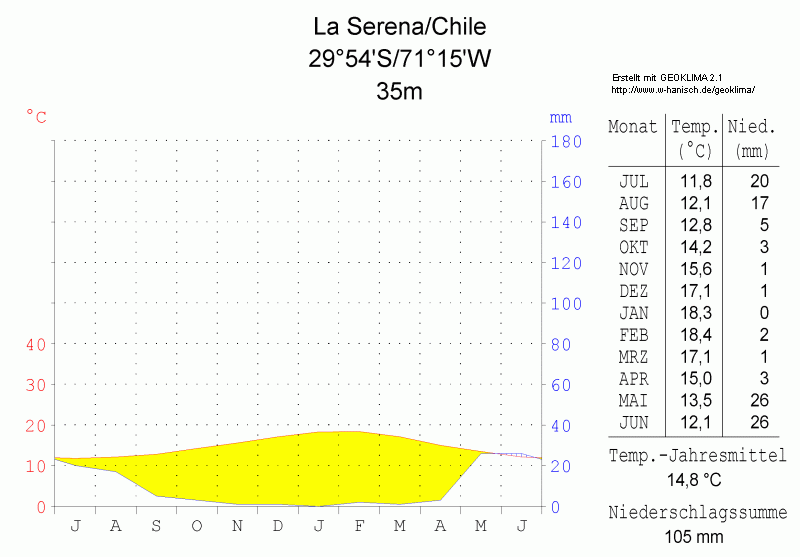
Graph of rainfall in the city during the year.

The city is commonly divided into various sectors. In the north is the airline sector, subdivided into two sub-sectors called High and Low Company. Nearby is San Pedro Creek. To the south are the areas of La Pampa, San Joaquin and the El Milagro. To the east are the sectors of La Antena, Juan XXIII, La Florida, Colina El Pino and the University District. Finally, to the west is the area of Avenida del Mar. Areas surrounding the city are mainly areas for growing vegetables, and there are a large number of plantations for the cultivation of chirimoyas, avocados and oranges, in addition to where vegetation has an average with some areas found mainly eucalyptus forests. These areas are normally conducive to wildfires sparked during the summer season (January–February).

=== Climate ===
La Serena has a cool desert climate, similar to nearby places in that it is clearly seasonal – in summer there is an absence of precipitation, but with abundant morning cloudiness and drizzle. which dissipates around noon, giving way to clear skies and 22 °C (72 °F) days.

In winter, the temperatures descend to between 7 and 16 °C (45 and 61 °F). Being located in a coastal zone, the minimums and maximums are moderated by the maritime influence and the temperature of the cold Humboldt Current. Winter (specifically from May to August) is the rainy season, with a total rainfall of approximately 100 mm (3.94 in) annually in a normal year, notable exceptions being the year 1997 which experienced a total rainfall in the city near 200 mm (7.87 in), 1880 with 366 millimetres (14.41 in) and 1888 when as much as 417 millimetres (16.42 in) fell including 239 millimetres (9.41 in) in August. The driest year has been 1979 with only 4.5 millimetres (0.18 in), whilst recent years, as in central Chile and Zona Sur, have tended to be drier than the long-term mean.

Climate data for La Serena (1991–2020, extremes 1954–present)
Month	Jan	Feb	Mar	Apr	May	Jun	Jul	Aug	Sep	Oct	Nov	Dec	Year
Record high °C (°F)	27.2 (81.0)	26.9 (80.4)	25.6 (78.1)	28.5 (83.3)	26.6 (79.9)	28.4 (83.1)	28.2 (82.8)	27.0 (80.6)	27.1 (80.8)	26.2 (79.2)	25.2 (77.4)	25.1 (77.2)	28.5 (83.3)
Mean daily maximum °C (°F)	21.5 (70.7)	21.5 (70.7)	20.2 (68.4)	18.4 (65.1)	16.9 (62.4)	15.8 (60.4)	15.4 (59.7)	15.8 (60.4)	16.4 (61.5)	17.4 (63.3)	18.6 (65.5)	20.0 (68.0)	18.2 (64.8)
Daily mean °C (°F)	17.9 (64.2)	17.9 (64.2)	16.7 (62.1)	14.9 (58.8)	13.3 (55.9)	12.0 (53.6)	11.4 (52.5)	11.9 (53.4)	12.6 (54.7)	13.6 (56.5)	14.9 (58.8)	16.4 (61.5)	14.5 (58.1)
Mean daily minimum °C (°F)	14.3 (57.7)	14.3 (57.7)	13.3 (55.9)	11.3 (52.3)	9.7 (49.5)	8.2 (46.8)	7.4 (45.3)	8.0 (46.4)	8.9 (48.0)	9.8 (49.6)	11.3 (52.3)	12.8 (55.0)	10.8 (51.4)
Record low °C (°F)	1.4 (34.5)	9.1 (48.4)	0.0 (32.0)	3.9 (39.0)	0.9 (33.6)	1.0 (33.8)	0.0 (32.0)	0.2 (32.4)	0.9 (33.6)	0.8 (33.4)	1.0 (33.8)	1.2 (34.2)	0.0 (32.0)
Average precipitation mm (inches)	0.2 (0.01)	0.1 (0.00)	1.1 (0.04)	0.8 (0.03)	13.1 (0.52)	29.9 (1.18)	17.1 (0.67)	12.7 (0.50)	4.2 (0.17)	3.3 (0.13)	0.4 (0.02)	0.3 (0.01)	83.2 (3.28)
Average precipitation days (≥ 1.0 mm)	0.0	0.0	0.1	0.2	1.0	1.8	1.6	1.3	0.7	0.4	0.1	0.0	7.2
Average relative humidity (%)	79	79	82	82	83	82	82	82	82	80	80	79	81
Mean monthly sunshine hours	255.5	231.8	196.2	159.3	148.8	150.4	172.2	176.5	169.1	204.9	210.7	241.5	2,316.9
Source 1: Dirección Meteorológica de Chile
Source 2: NOAA (precipitation days 1991–2020)

== Demographics ==
Historical population
Year	Pop.	±% p.a.
1875	23,026	—
1885	28,346	+2.10%
1895	27,502	−0.30%
1907	29,547	+0.60%
1920	27,432	−0.57%
1930	32,096	+1.58%
1940	35,055	+0.89%
1952	46,588	+2.40%
1970	72,141	+2.46%
1982	95,118	+2.33%
1992	120,816	+2.42%
2002	160,148	+2.86%
2017	221,054	+2.17%
2024	250,141	+1.78%
Source: INE, Memoria Chilena

As of the 2024 census, the population is 250,141, of which 48.1% are males, and 51.9% are females. People aged under 15 years old make up 18.2% of the population, and people aged 65 years old and over make up 13.2%. 88.0% of the population is urban and 12.0% is rural.

In 2002, 155,815 persons lived in the city proper, and La Serena was part of the country's fourth largest conurbation (pop. 300,000) with nearby Coquimbo, with a total area of 1,892 square kilometres (731 sq mi). A few of the major city sectors are: El Centro ("downtown"), Peñuelas (actually a suburb between La Serena and Coquimbo), San Joaquín (neighborhood on a hill overlooking the ocean), La Florida, Las Compañías ("the companies"), Cerro Grande ("big hill"), La Antena and the new El Milagro ("the miracle") development.

=== Ethnic minorities ===
As of the 2024 census, Indigenous peoples make up 10.5% of the population, and Afro-Chileans make up 0.9%.

=== Religion ===
As of the 2024 census, 72.8% of the population over 15 years old are Christians (61.0% Catholics, 7.7% Evangelicals or Protestants, and 4.2% other branches), 0.1% are Jews, 0.1% are Muslims, 0.1% are Buddhists, 0.04% are Hinduists, 0.4% are adrehents of other religions, and 26.4% are irreligious.

=== Immigration ===
As of the 2024 census, immigrants make up 6.2% of the population – 5.6% are from South America, 0.4% from North America, 0.2% from Europe, 0.1% from Asia, 0.01% from Africa, and 0.01% from Oceania.

== Administration ==
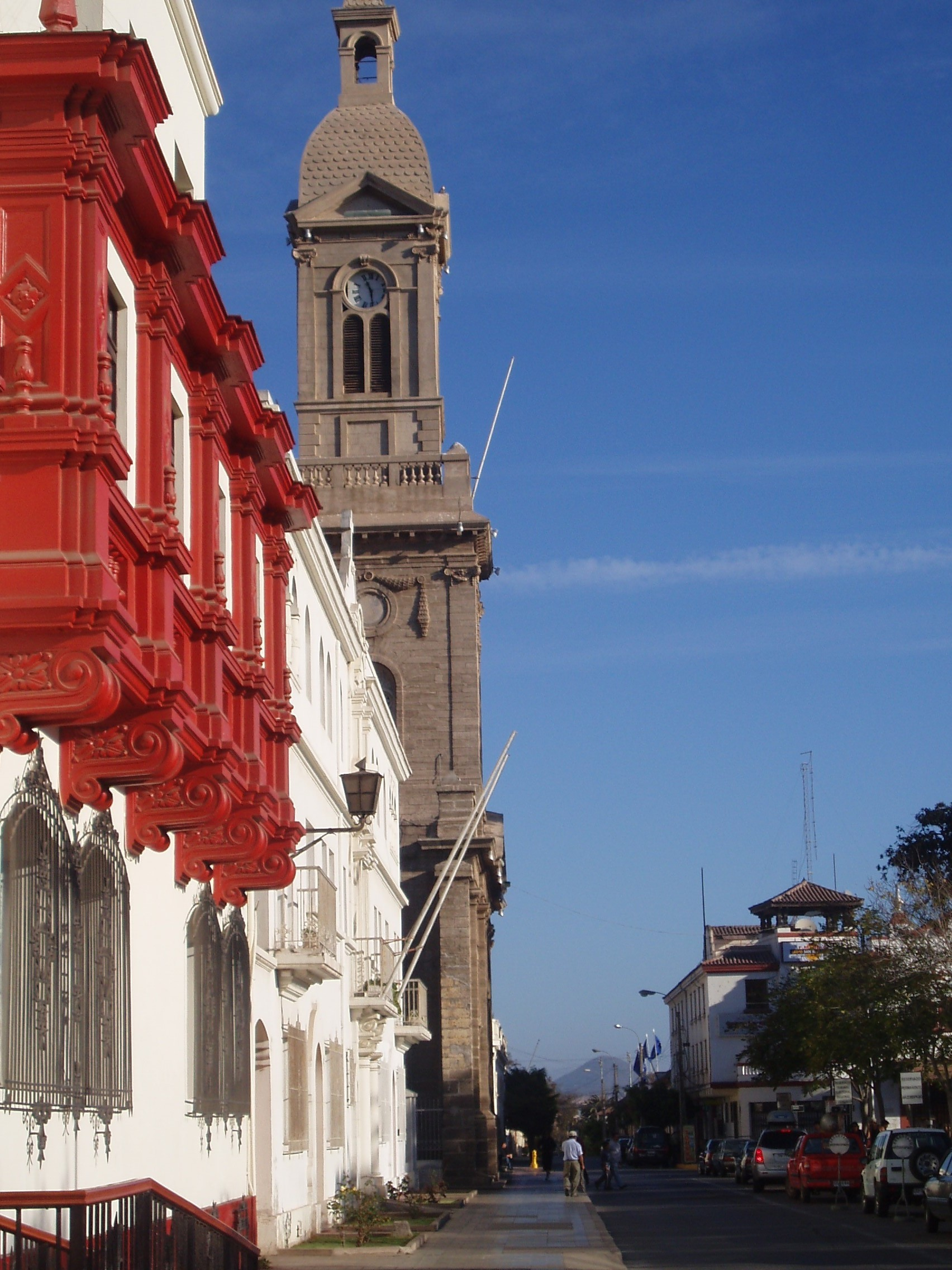
Side view of the Courts of Justice, Archdiocese and Cathedral.

As a commune, La Serena is a third-level administrative division of Chile administered by a municipal council, headed by a mayor who is directly elected every four years. Since October 2024, the city's interim mayor is Luis Henríquez.

Within the electoral divisions of Chile, La Serena is represented in the Chamber of Deputies by Mario Bertolino (RN) and Marcelo Díaz (PS) as part of the 7th electoral district, (together with La Higuera, Vicuña, Paihuano and Andacollo). The commune is represented in the Senate by Sergio Gahona Salazar (UDI), Daniel Núñez Arancibia (PC) and Matías Walker Prieto (PDC) as part of the fourth senatorial constituency (Coquimbo Region).

== Architecture ==
Between 1948 and 1952, president Gabriel González Videla prepared the Plan Serena, a project in which the city was renewed with investments and urban redevelopment that would imprint a single seal on the country. It began to take hold in the role of services, to rescue and to develop its own architectural style known as Colonial Revival. The city is the seat of the Roman Catholic Archdiocese of La Serena. The cathedral, built from the same stone and clade, dates from the 19th century. It must be said that although it lacks the same historical value as the older churches, this is a stone building in a country prone to seismic activity, and has survived various earthquakes. Indeed, during centuries of existence, there is almost no visible damage. All of these churches, along with others of minor importance, provide a unique urban landscape, an image for the city, giving it the nickname "The City of Churches."

Its traditional architecture consists of a series of housing and public buildings, of late 19th-century vintage style, built with wood from the US state of Oregon brought to Chile as counterweight in vessels sailing to the nearby port of Coquimbo to load copper and other minerals for transport back to the US. This Oregon pine and the use of adobe create the genuine image of the city.

There is also a number of remarkable and valuable small churches built of sedimentary stone quarried 5 km (3 mi) to the north of the Elqui River, having a characteristic color and texture formed by myriad small shells. These churches are all roughly 350 years old and have undergone restoration to varying degrees, bringing them back to their original form. San Francisco, San Agustín, Santo Domingo are the names of a few of them. In 1920, he began to take shape a new economic boom in the mining of iron, attracting capital and human contingent, resulting in a further change in the urban structure.

Currently, the city has its own architectural style (known as "neocolonial"), which is differentiated from other cities, preserving old buildings in colonial style, with many important National Monuments, mixing it with modern buildings but each one in turn follows the regulatory framework in the construction of these structures which should each have features to maintain the colonial style of the city. In the center of the city until 2008, it is still not possible to identify buildings over eight stories high for a municipal status, however towards the coastal area of the Avenida del Mar, one begins to see a great real estate boom that is distinguished by high-rise buildings, ranging from La Serena running south and along the coast to the neighboring city of Coquimbo.

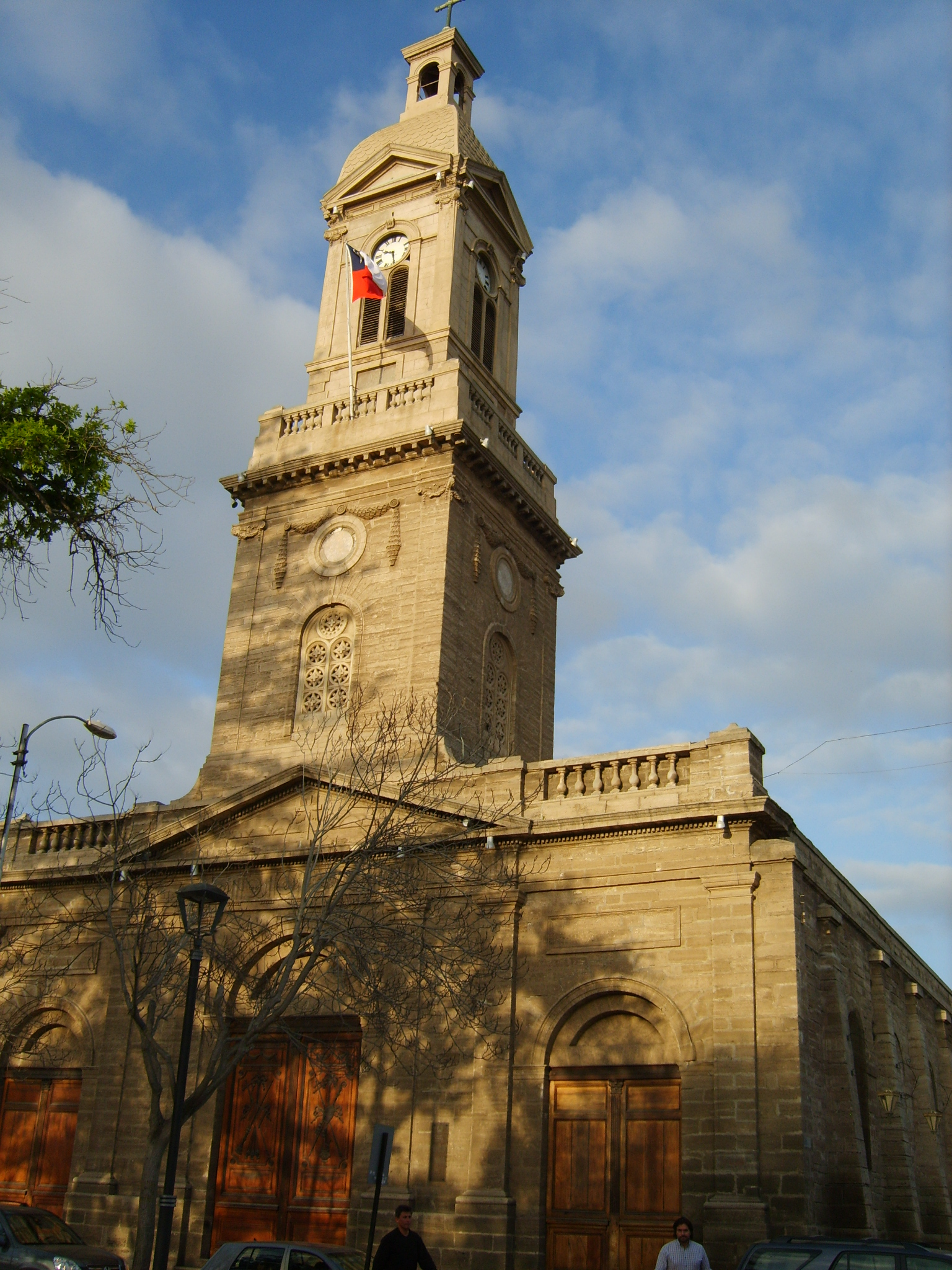
Cathedral of La Serena (Catedral de La Serena).

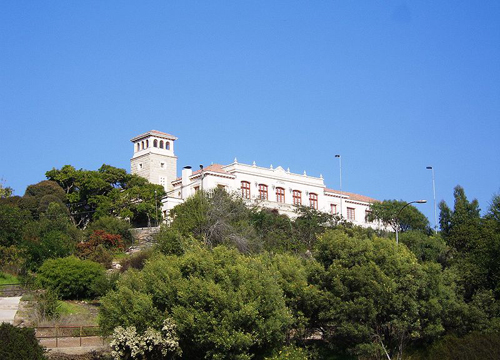
University of La Serena.

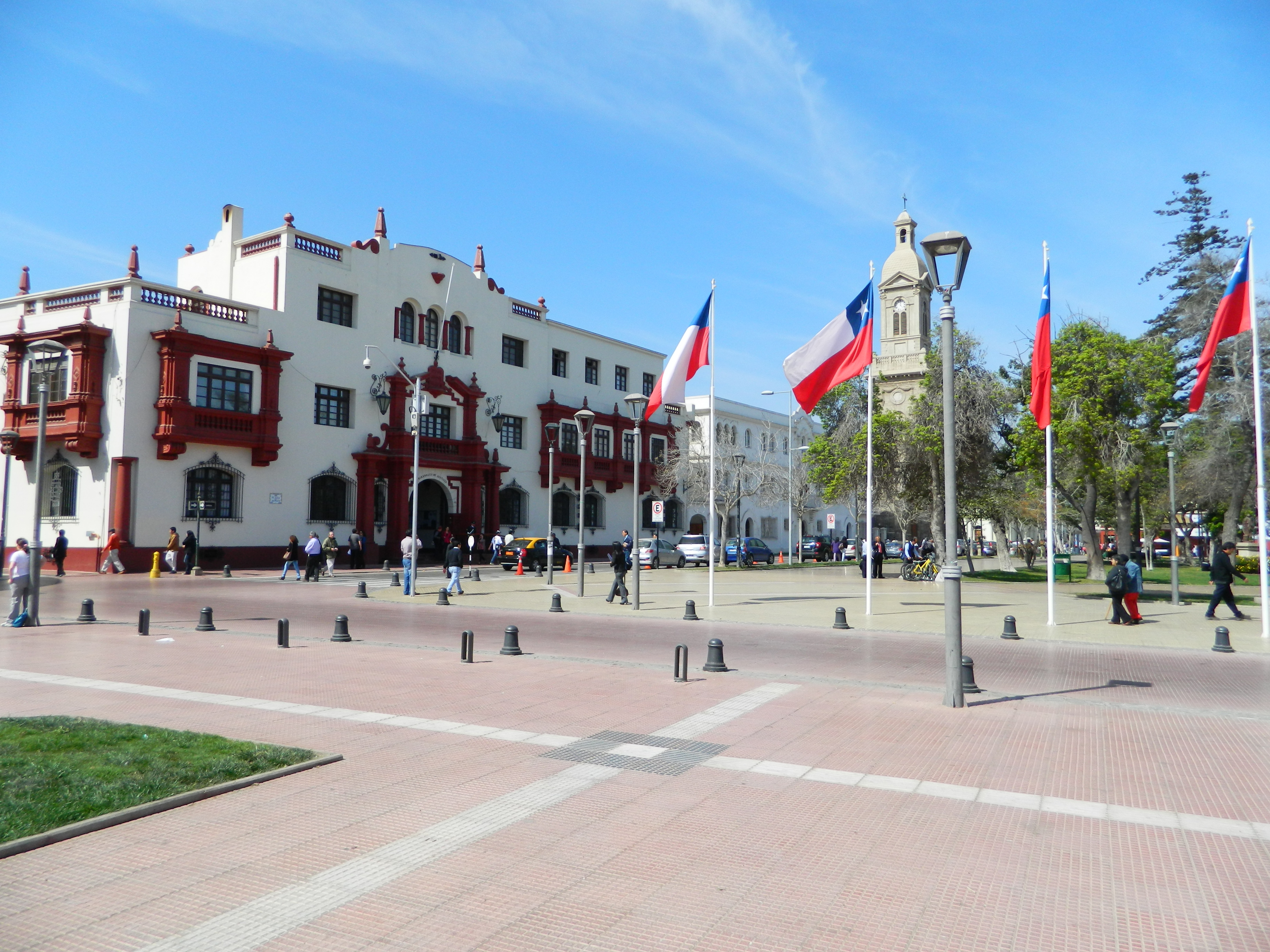
Courts of Justice and Plaza de Armas.

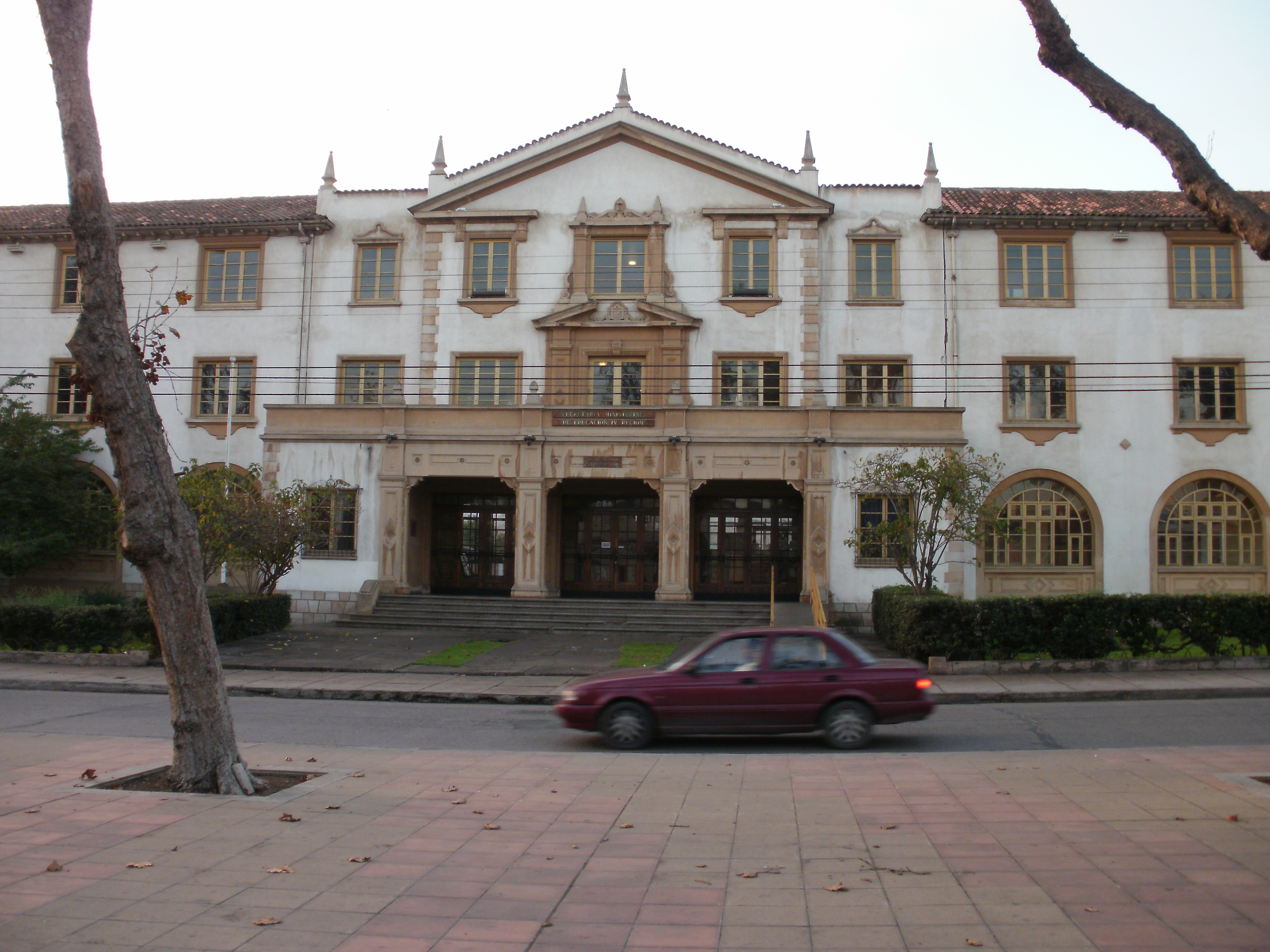
Regional Ministerial Secretary of Education.

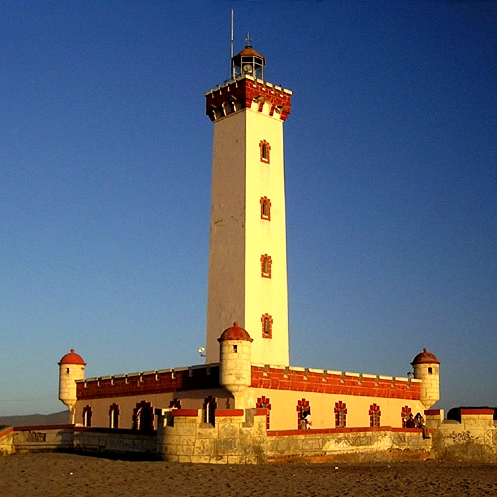
Lighthouse of La Serena ("El Faro").

== Economy ==
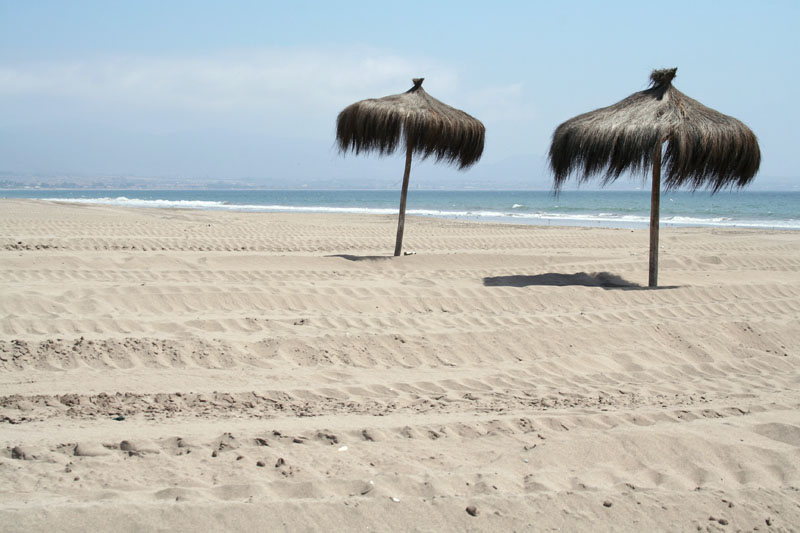
The beaches, the main economic resource in tourism.

In the last decades, tourism has turned into one of the most important economic activities. The population doubles in the summer months, principally for the beaches, recreational activities, musical festivals, concerts, and Fashion Week. In addition, the city is an obligatory stop for hundreds of pilgrims that arrive to the city of Coquimbo, where during The Serenade they find lodging for visiting the zone and Valle de Elqui.

In this city there are located branches of the more important chain stores of the country, Mall Plaza La Serena, which has the national shops Falabella and París. Also Mall Puerta Del Mar, contains two supermarkets, and regional multistores, such as La Elegante, and shops for home and construction. The downtown is one of the places with major economic and financial institutions of the Coquimbo Region.

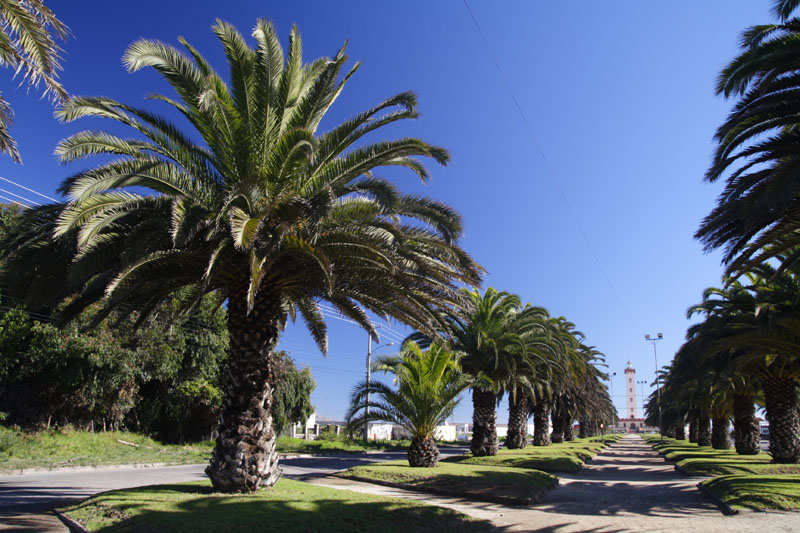
The end of Francisco De Aguirre Avenue.

=== Tourism ===
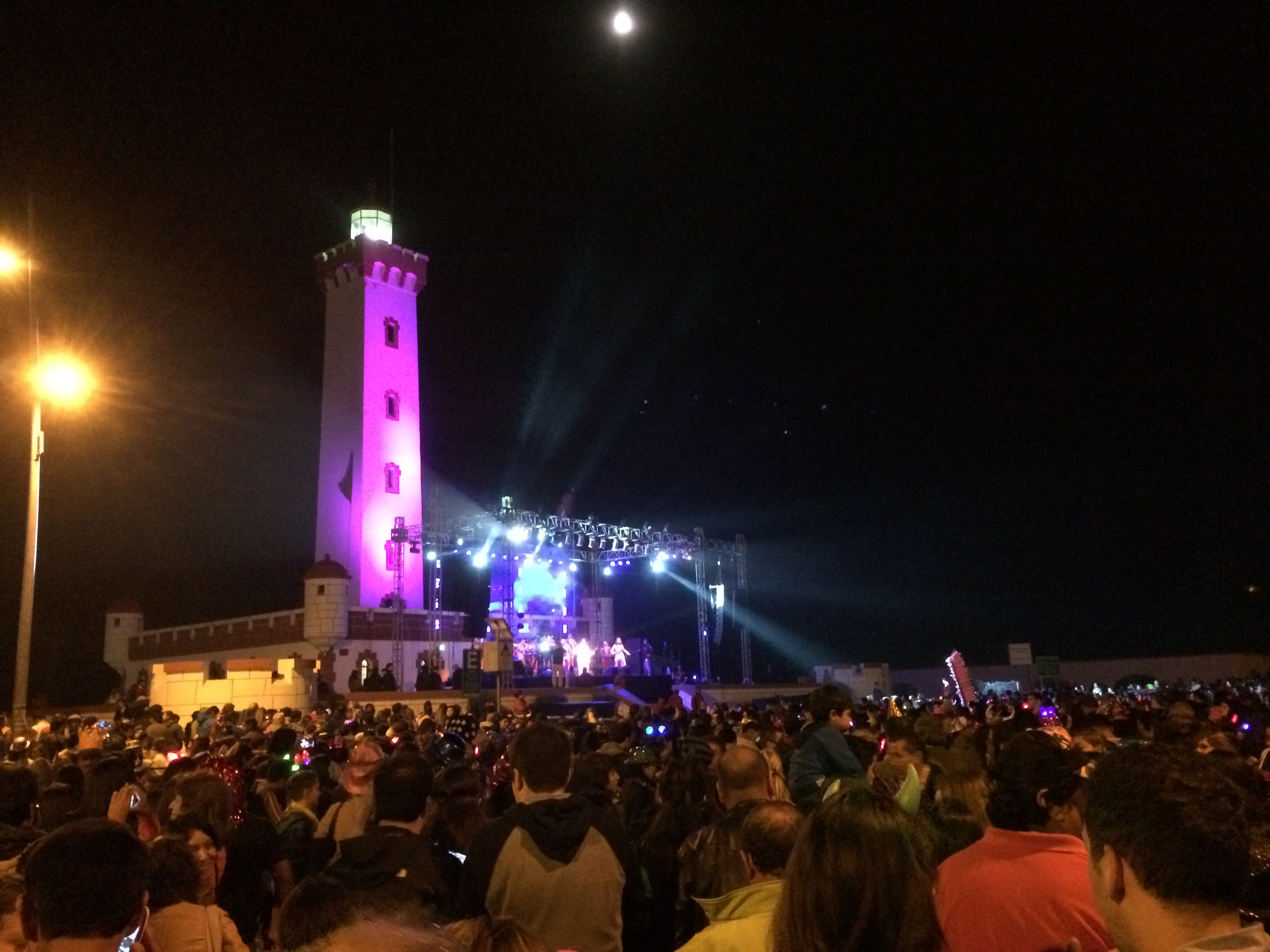
2015 New Year's Celebration at the Lighthouse ("el Faro").

The old part of the city is the largest and most important urban "traditional area" (zona típica) in Chile. The churches are distinguished by many styles of belfries, which led to the city being nicknamed "the city of the belfries".

The Church Cathedral of La Serena was designated a Historical Monument in 1981. Construction was initiated by the French architect Jean Herbage in 1844, and dedicated in 1856. It is the largest temple in the city, constructed in Neoclassic style, measuring 60 metres (200 feet) long by 20 metres (66 feet) wide, with three central bodies. Inside there is an organ donated by the philanthropist Juana Ross de Edwards. The belfry dates back from the 20th century.

The town has retained its historic architecture and this, along with a selection of beaches (known as Avenida del Mar, "Sea Avenue"), has caused the city to become a significant tourist destination, attracting many foreigners (most of them Argentines from San Juan and Mendoza provinces) during January, and later Santiago residents fleeing February heat.

The beaches of the Avenida Del Mar are some of the most crowded in La Serena, which run from the El Faro Monumental in the south to Peñuelas's beach in neighboring Coquimbo, an extension of 6 km (4 mi). However, the beaches of La Serena have very rough water and are not suitable for swimming. In comparison, beaches in Coquimbo, such as The Horseshoe, have very calm waters and clean sands.

The twelve beaches along the Avenida del Mar are El Faro, Los Fuertes, Mansa, Blanca, La Barca, Cuatro Esquinas, La Marina, El Pescador, El Corsario, Hipocampo, Las Gaviotas, and Canto del Agua. All of them except the beacon are suitable for the swimming and aquatic and nautical sports. In recent years the La Serena Song Festival (created in 2004) has been gaining national importance, due to the high quality of the invited artists. A new international airport has also been improved. Real estate development along the beach has created a tourist residential development along the Elqui River.

The most famous beach near La Serena is "Morrillos" with 25 km (16 mi) of sand and dunes. In the southern part of Morrillos is Guanaqueros, a spot with calm waters. Water temperatures can reach 25 °C (77 °F) in summer. A surf spot is Totoralillo beach with waves. "El Cacho" wave is one of the famous and works good with swells.

The best Enduro mountainbike spot is Cerro Grande just behind La Serena with several trails only for advanced to expert riders.

== Education ==
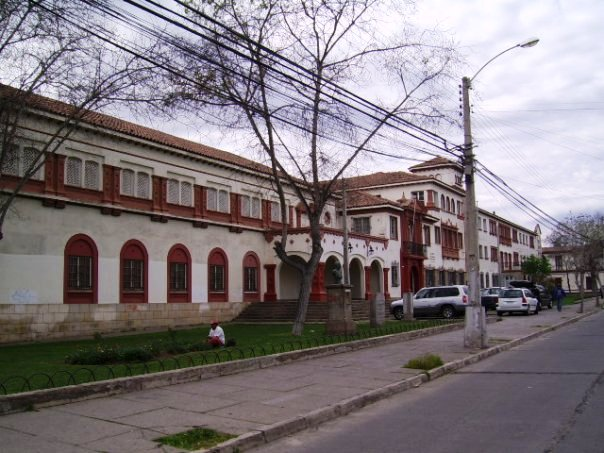
Liceo Gregorio Cordovez of La Serena

=== Schools and high schools ===
The city of La Serena holds a wide variety of schools, lyceums and universities, concentrating great part of the academical offer in the region. Among primary and secondary education, La Serena hosts public, subsidized (owned by the State, managed by privates), and privates schools (La Serena currently holds the entirety of private schools within the Greater La Serena area).

=== College and universities ===
Among the universities present in La Serena are the University of La Serena, traditional university with its headquarters and four other campuses in the city; other institutions include the Universidad Central (Central University), Universidad Santo Tomás (Saint Thomas University), Universidad Tecnológica de Chile – INACAP (Technological University of Chile), and Universidad del Mar.

=== Astronomical Research ===
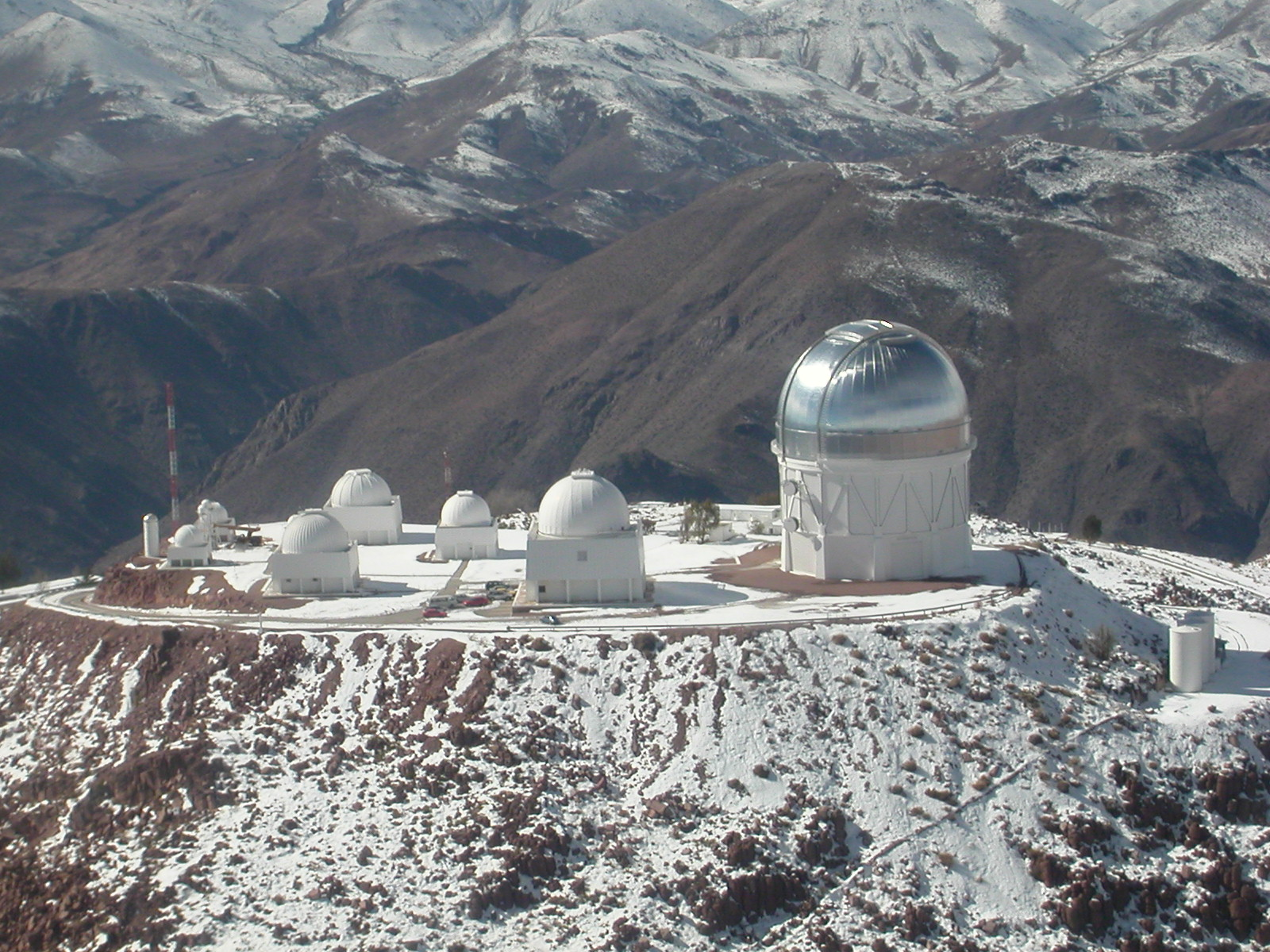
Aerial view of Cerro Tololo Inter-American Observatory

La Serena holds offices for the European Southern Observatory organisation (operator of La Silla Observatory), AURA, Inc. (operator of Cerro Tololo, located in the Valle de Elqui, about 85 km east of La Serena, and Gemini observatories), and for the Carnegie Institution for Science (operator of Las Campanas Observatory). It is also the home of the base facility of the Vera C. Rubin Observatory.

== Transport ==
La Serena relies on diverse means of transport to connect downtown with peripheral neighborhoods and Coquimbo, such as collective taxis, taxis and tour buses. In the past the city was the principal railway center for passenger transport to travel to the interior zone of Vicuña and Ovalle. Today, the only railroad that passes through parts of the city carries iron ore from El Romeral mine to Guayacán's port in Coquimbo.

The city relies on a bus station to provide transport from La Serena to most of the country, as well as an airport with daily flights to Santiago, Antofagasta, Arica, Copiapó and other destinations. Today there is a project to move the La Florida Airport to an area near Tongoy, Coquimbo, due to population growth close to the current airport with all the danger that this implies.

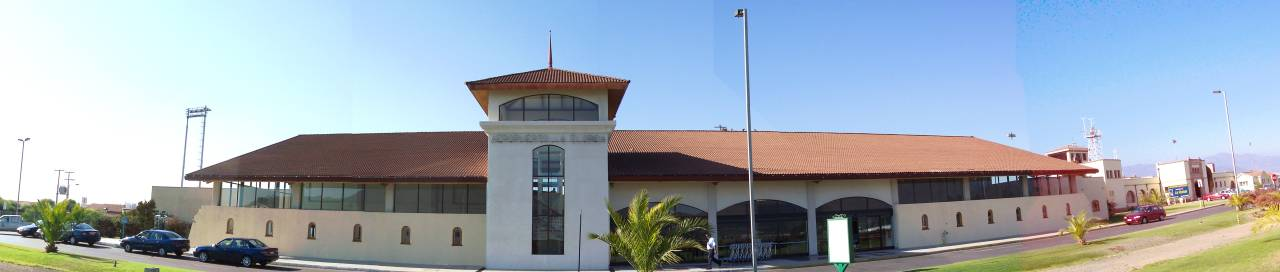
La Florida Airport of La Serena

== Sports ==
The city has a football team called Club Deportes La Serena that plays in the second tier of the Chilean league of football. Their home games are played at the La Portada stadium, which has seating for approximately 18,000 spectators. Their biggest rivals are near-neighbors Coquimbo Unido. They are nicknamed "Los Papayeros", because of the papayas that are grown near La Serena in the Elqui Valley.

Since 2007, there has been a professional tennis tournament, the Challenger de La Serena, on the courts of the Estadio Universidad del Mar, in which the first champion was the Argentine Mariano Zabaleta. The courts also hosted the Davis Cup series between Chile and Russia at the beginning of February 2007.

== Notable people ==
- Juana Ross Edwards (1830–1913), philanthropist
- Marcial Martínez Cuadros (1832–1918), lawyer and politician
- Alberto Guerrero (1886–1959), composer, pianist and teacher
- Gabriel González Videla (1898–1980), 24th president of Chile
- José Cademartori (1930–2024), writer, academic, politician (member of Salvador Allende's cabinet)
- Valeska Zambra (born 1994), physicist
- Cris MJ (born 2001), singer and songwriter
- FloyyMenor (born 2005), singer and songwriter

== International relations ==
The city of La Serena is home to a number of international relations institutions, such as the Regional Unit for International Affairs (URAI) of the Regional Government of Coquimbo, responsible for analyzing and managing the region's bilateral and multilateral relations with Latin America and the rest of the world; the Commission on International and Legal Affairs of the Regional Council of Coquimbo; the Agua Negra Pass Argentina–Chile Integration Committee; the regional office of the National Migration Service; the regional office of the General Directorate for Export Promotion (ProChile); the Department of Migration and International Police of the Investigations Police of Chile; and the Migrant Office of the Municipality of La Serena.

=== Internationalization in higher education ===
In the field of international relations and higher education, the main actors in La Serena are the Office of International Relations of the University of La Serena, and the Korea Program of the Central University of Chile, Coquimbo Regional Campus.

=== Twin towns – sister cities ===
La Serena is twinned with:

- Changzhou, China (2016)
- Hawaii County, United States (1994)
- Kraków, Poland (1995)
- Millbrae, United States (1963)
- San Juan, Argentina
- Talavera de la Reina, Spain
- Tenri, Japan (1966)
- Tlalnepantla de Baz, Mexico (2002)
- Castuera, Spain
- Campanario, Spain

=== Consulates ===
- Germany (Honorary Consulate)
- Brazil (Honorary Consulate)
- France (Honorary Consulate)
- Hungary (Honorary Consulate)
- Italy (Honorary Vice-Consulate)
- Poland (Honorary Consulate)
- Syria (Honorary Consulate)
