= Sesto Fiorentino =

- Comune
- Comune di Sesto Fiorentino
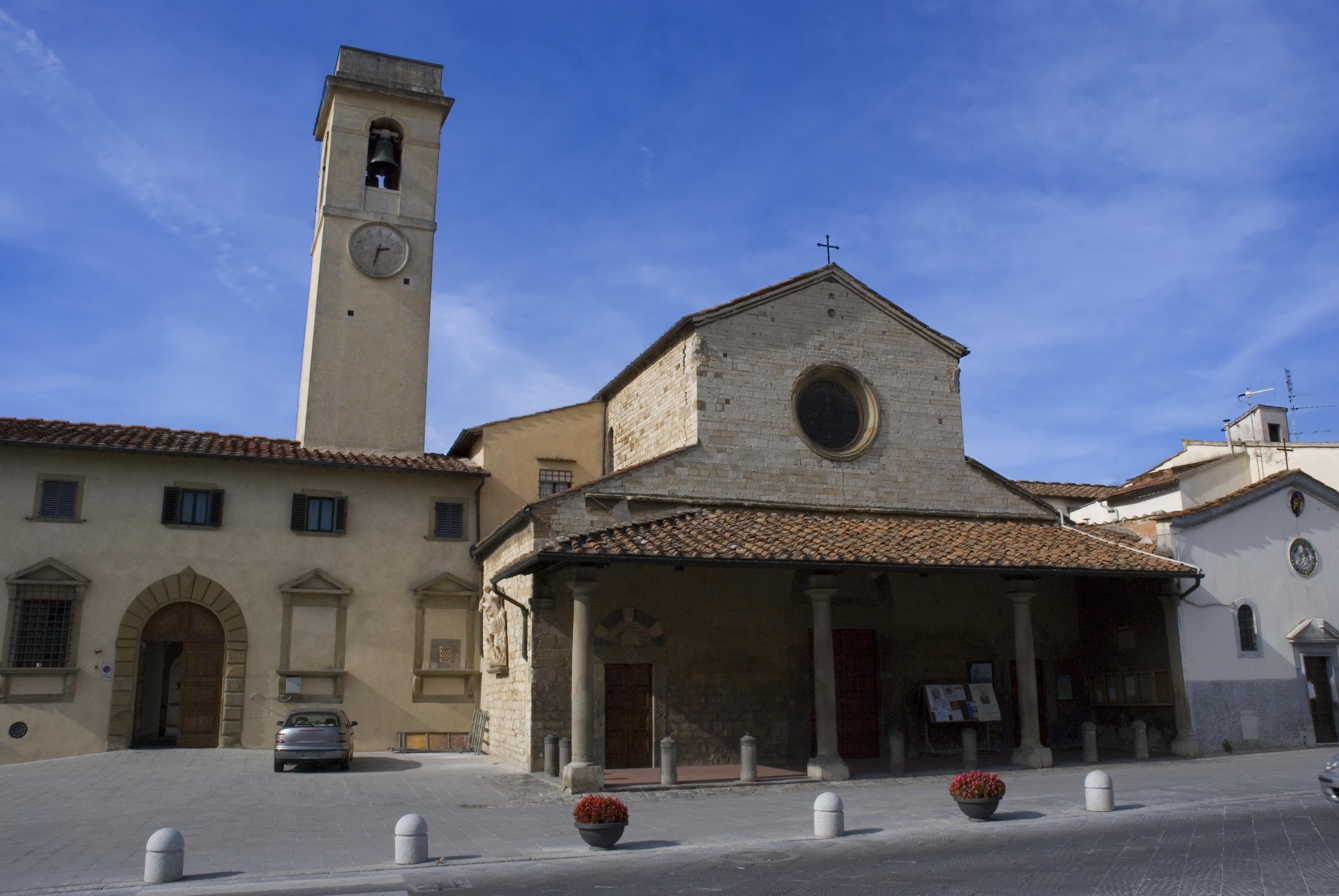
- Pieve of San Martino.

- Coat of arms

- Location within Italy Location within Tuscany
- Coordinates: 43°49′55″N 11°11′58″E
- Country: Italy
- Region: Tuscany
- Metropolitan city: Florence (FI)
- Frazioni: Canonica, Cercina, Colonnata, Gualdo, La Zambra, Osmannoro, Padule, Querceto, Quinto Alto, Quinto Basso, Valiversi

Government
  - Mayor: Lorenzo Falchi (Italian Left)

Area
  - Total: 49 km^{2} (19 sq mi)
- Elevation: 55 m (180 ft)

Population (1 January 2015)
  - Total: 48,946
  - Density: 1,000/km^{2} (2,600/sq mi)
- Demonym: Sestesi
- Time zone: UTC+1 (CET)
  - Summer (DST): UTC+2 (CEST)
- Postal code: 50019
- Dialing code: 055
- Patron saint: Saint Martin of Tours
- Saint day: 11 November
- Website: Official website

Sesto Fiorentino (Italian pronunciation: [ˈsɛsto fjorenˈtiːno]), known locally as just Sesto, is a commune in the Metropolitan City of Florence, Tuscany, central Italy.

== History ==
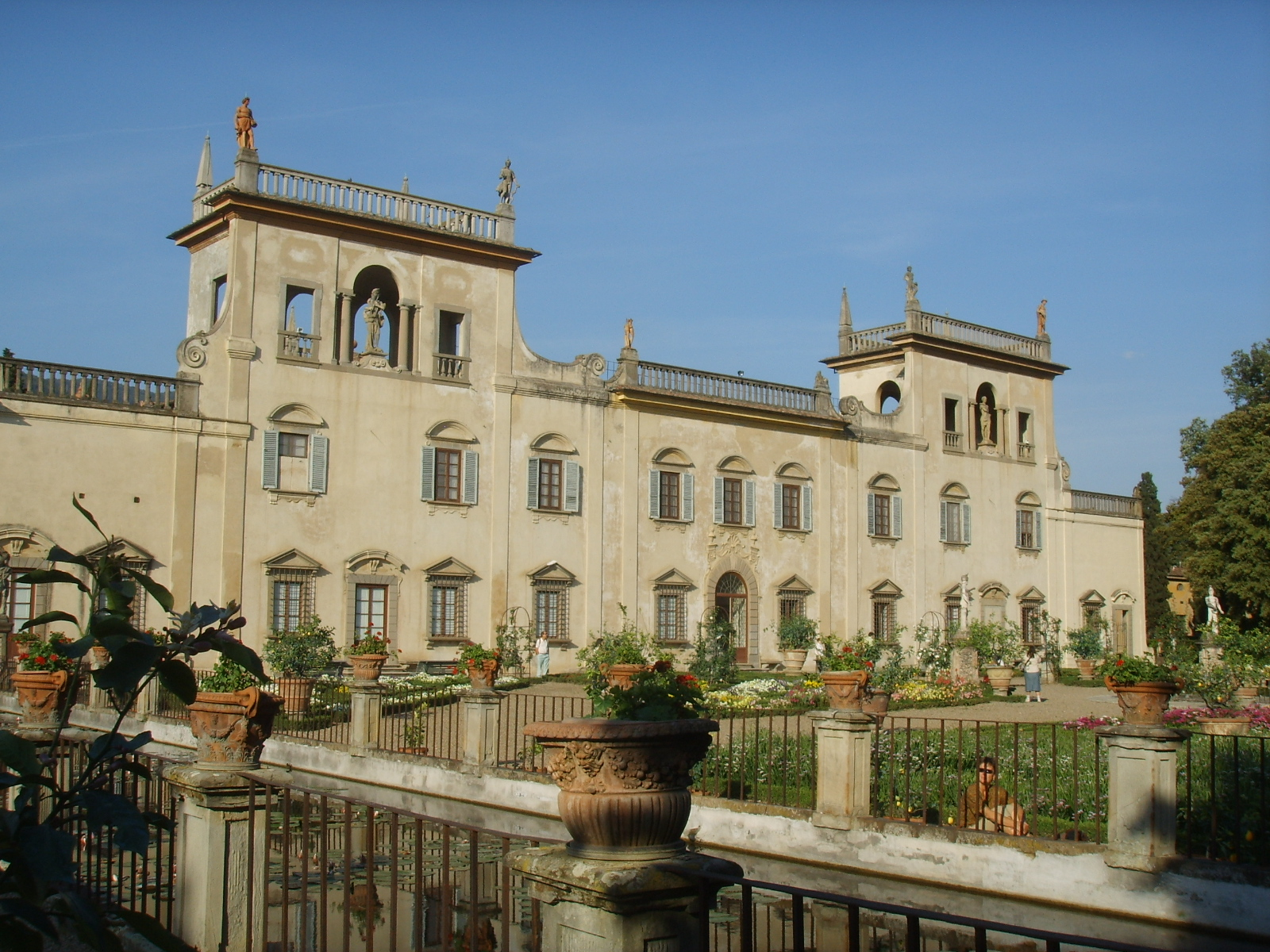
Villa Guicciardini Corsi Salviati in Sesto Fiorentino.

The oldest known human settlement in the area dates from the Mesolithic (c. 9,000 years ago). The Etruscan presence is known from the 7th century BC, but the town proper was created by the Romans as Sextus ab urbe lapis ("Sixth mile from the Town Milestone"). The first churches were built in the early Middle Ages, among which the most important became the Pieve of San Martino. Sesto Fiorentino was subject to the Archbishop of Florence. Later it was under the Florentine Republic, which dried the plain and boosted the area's economy starting from the Renaissance age.

In 1735, Marquis Carlo Ginori founded one of the first porcelain plants in Europe, the Manifattura di Doccia. Now under the name Richard-Ginori, the company is still located in Sesto, and is the largest porcelain manufacturer in Italy. Toward the end of the 19th century, craftsmen who had been trained at Richard-Ginori began to start their own pottery studios, some of which also grew into factories. There are currently over one hundred producers of pottery in Sesto Fiorentino, and a state school for teaching pottery, now called L'Istituto Statale d'Arte.

Sesto Fiorentino was annexed by plebiscite to the newly unified Kingdom of Italy in 1860. The town was a protagonist in the late 19th century workers struggle, and in 1897 it elected the second socialist member ever of the Italian Parliament, Giuseppe Pescetti. In 1899 it was the first town in Tuscany to have a socialist mayor.

== Main sights ==
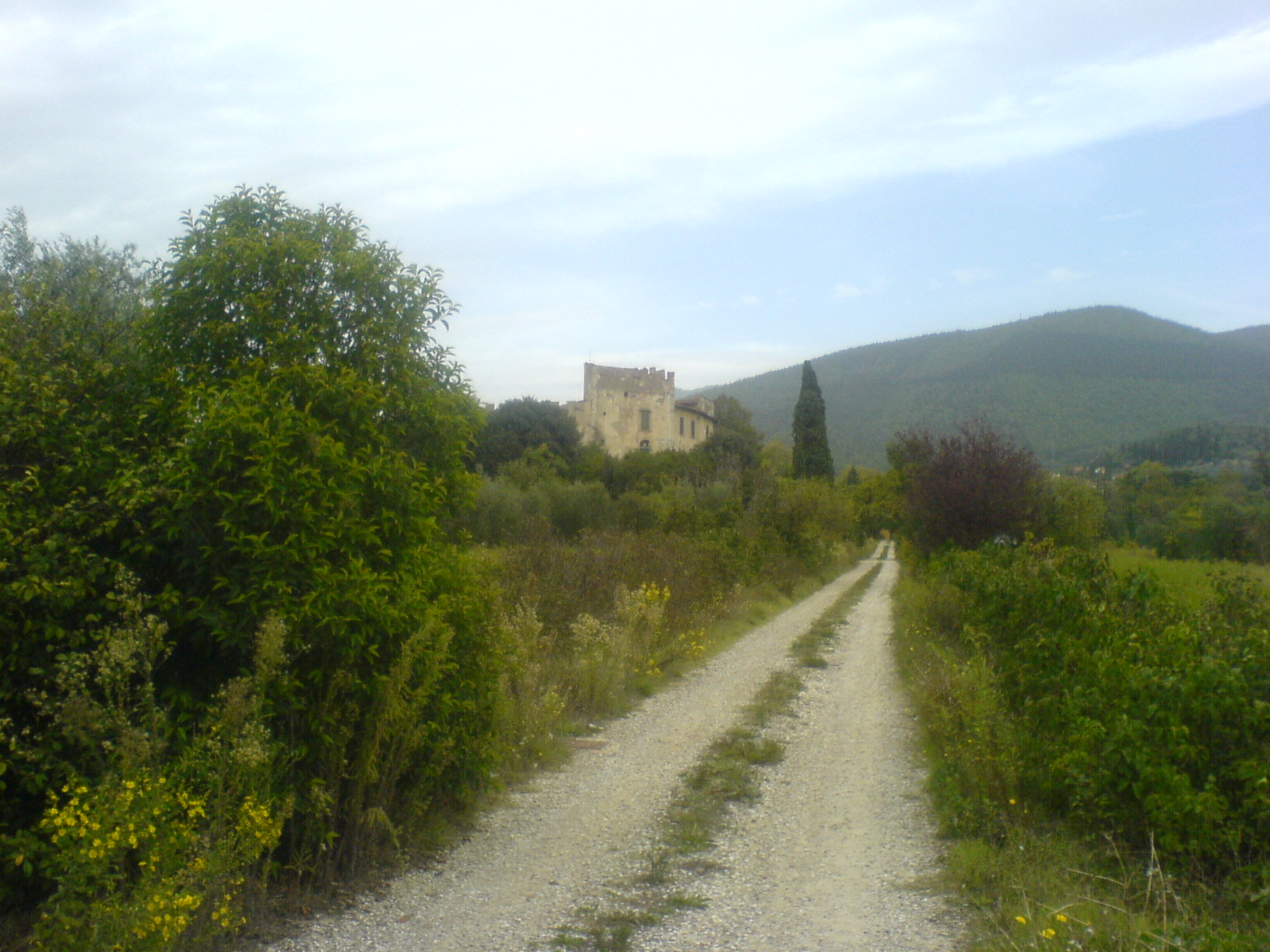
Tomba della Mula and view of Monte Morello.

- Pieve di San Martino (Parish church of St. Martin), known from around the year 1000. The interior has a nave and two aisles, the inner part dating from the 12th century. On the high altar is a Crucifix by Agnolo Gaddi (1390); notable are also a Circumcision by Jacopo Vignali and a Four Saints by Santi di Tito.
- Palazzo Pretorio (1477).
- Santa Maria a Quinto, mentioned in the 11th century but rebuilt in the 18th century. It houses a notable triptych by Spinello Aretino and Annunciation from 1410.
- Villa Guicciardini Corsi Salviati
- Villa La Zambra
- Villa Paolina
- Villa Villoresi
- Park of Villa Gamba, known as Parco del Neto, an English-style garden built in 1853.
- Etruscan findings include the Tomba della Montagnola (7th century BC), the Tomba della Mula and the Necropolis of Palastreto (8th-6th centuries BC).

== International relations ==
Sesto Fiorentino is twinned with:

- Wieliczka, Poland
- Al Mahbes, Sahrawi Arab Democratic Republic
- Bagnolet, France
- Stefanaconi, Italy

== In literature ==
Sesto Fiorentino and its surroundings inspired the setting for the book The Adventures of Pinocchio.

Sherlock Holmes scholars determined that the unnamed Italian town in "The Adventure of the Empty House" was Sesto, and a bust of Holmes stands in the town.

== People ==
- Architect Emilio Barbieri was born in Sesto Firorentino (1862 –?)
- Poet Alberta Bigagli was born in Sesto Firorentino in 1928.
- Cyclist Alfredo Martini died in Sesto Fiorentino in 2014. Since 2021, a yearly cycling race honours his name.
