= Iglesia de San Agustín (La Serena) =

Catholic church in La Serena, Chile

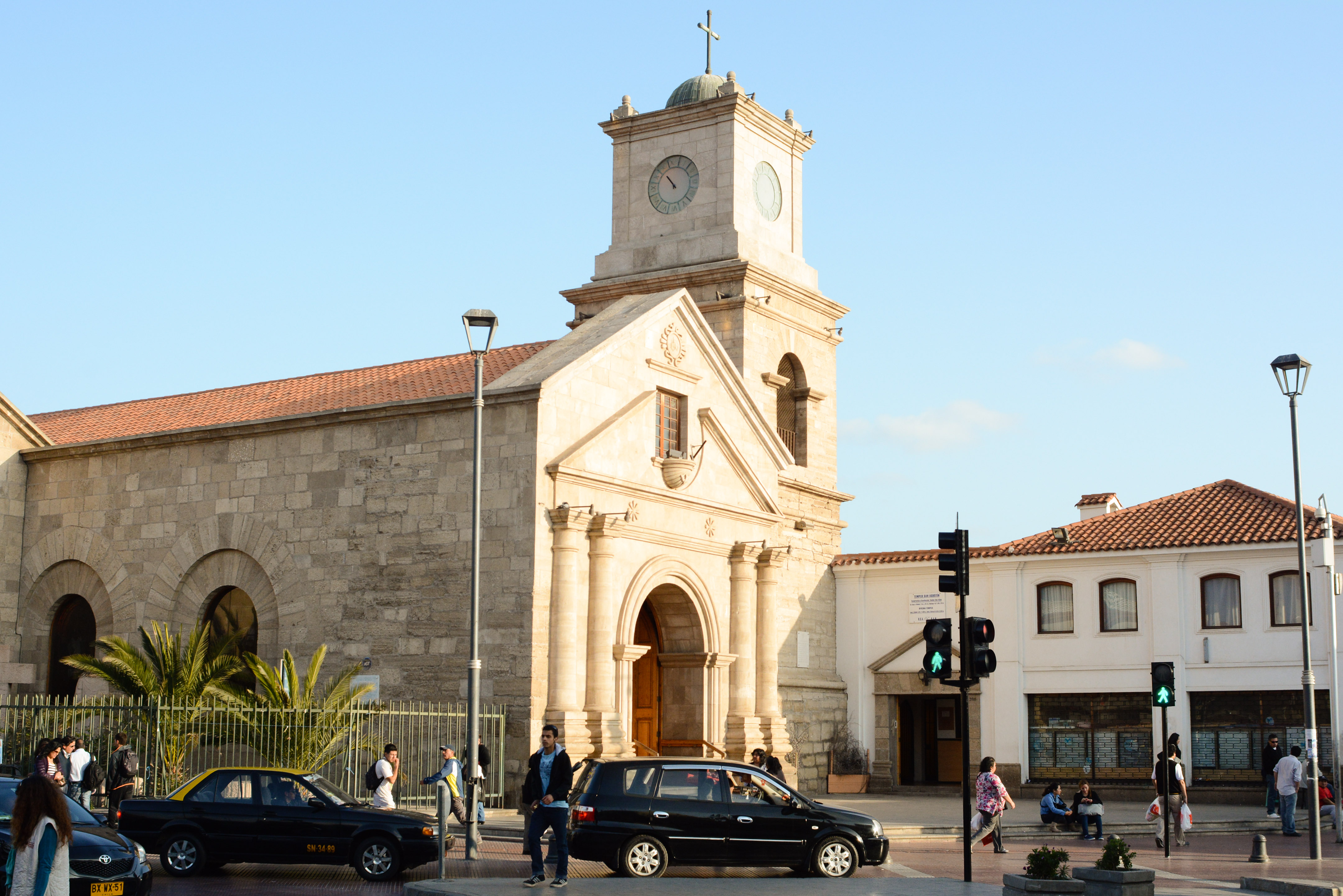
- Iglesia de San Agustín
- 29.9020°S 71.2466°W
- Location: Arturo Prat 690, La Serena
- Country: Chile
- Denomination: Roman Catholic

Architecture
- Style: Eclectic

Administration
- Archdiocese: Roman Catholic Archdiocese of La Serena

The Church of St Augustine is a Catholic church located in La Serena, Chile.

== History ==
The original church dates from 1672 and was built by the Society of Jesus. In 1680 it was set on fire by the pirate Bartholomew Sharp. In 1768 the church went on to be staffed by the Augustinians.

In 1798 the upper stage of the tower was destroyed by a storm and rebuilt the following year. The tower was later badly damaged again, this time by an earthquake in 1847, and was rebuilt by Juan Herbage three years later. In 1903, another earthquake caused structural damage to the church. It burned down in 1912, and was rebuilt in 1913 as a three-nave church.

In 1959 a fire destroyed the rebuilt church. It suffered severe damage from the 1975 Coquimbo earthquake. The more recent rebuilding of the church, led by architect Pedro Broquedis, began in 1985 and was completed in 1994, the year of the 450th anniversary of the foundation of La Serena, being officially opened on August 18, 1995 – although the masses were resumed in 1990 in the northeast portion of the church. In 2002, the Order of Augustinian Recollects undertook the management of the church.

The church is located at the intersection of Arturo Prat and Cienfuegos streets, facing La Recova. It is eclectic in style.
