= Alberta Bigagli =

Italian psychologist and poet

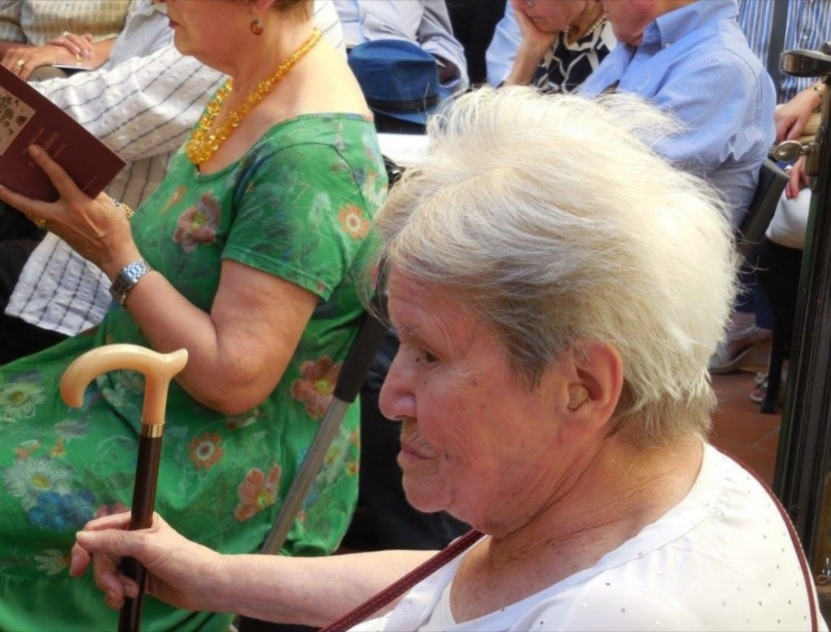

Alberta Bigagli was an Italian psychologist and poet, born in Sesto Fiorentino in 1928. She died in August 2017. Her published works include the poetry collections L'arca di Noè (1986), In mezzo al cerchio (1989), Diamanti (1994), Olindo del fuoco (2001), and the prose collection L’amore è altro (1975).
