= Iglesia de Santo Domingo (La Serena) =

Catholic church in La Serena, Chile

Coordinates: 29.9035°S 71.2537°W

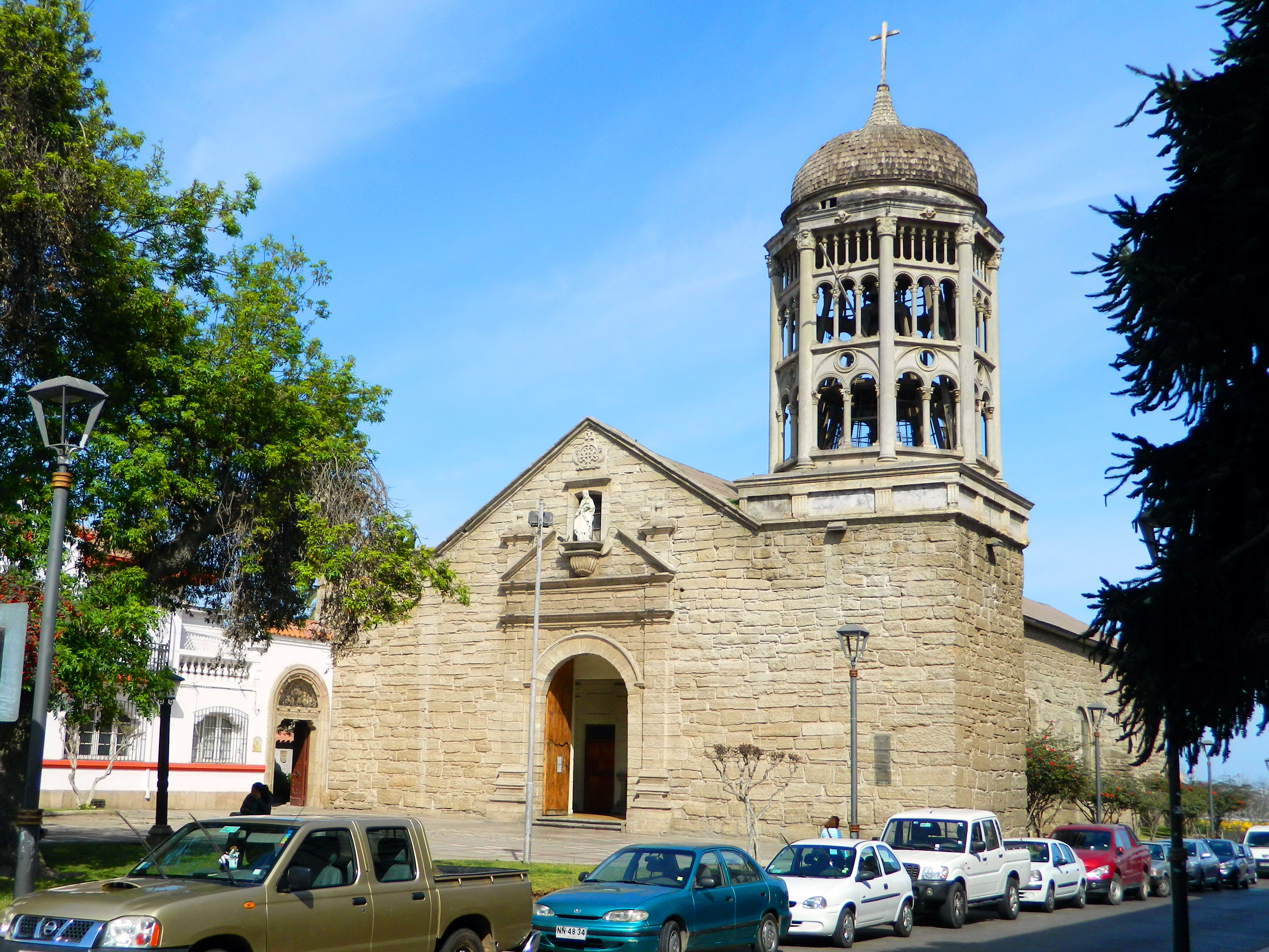

Religion
- Affiliation: Roman Catholic

Location
- Municipality: La Serena
- Country: Chile
- Interactive map of Iglesia de Santo Domingo

The Iglesia de Santo Domingo is a Catholic church at 235 Gregorio Cordovez Street, between Manuel Antonio Matta and Pedro Pablo Muñoz streets, in the historic quarter of La Serena, Chile. It was declared a National Monument of Chile on May 16, 2001.

It is one of the five colonial churches built of stone in the city. The church was built between the 17th and 18th centuries in Mannerist style. But its eclectic bell tower was erected in the second half of the 19th century.

== First church ==
The Dominican Order arrived in the territory in 1615 with the purpose of evangelizing the inhabitants of Copiapó, Combarbalá, Illapel, Aconcagua and surrounding areas. From 1673 to 1675, the Dominicans built the first church of ashlar and wood dedicated to Saint Dominic in La Serena.

On September 15, 1686, the English pirate Edward Davis, along with 200 buccaneers, tried to take over the city and failed, being forced to barricade himself in the church and the cloister. Soldiers and members of the militia repelled the aggressors, forcing Davis to flee but before he torched some rooms of the cloister.

== Rebuildings ==
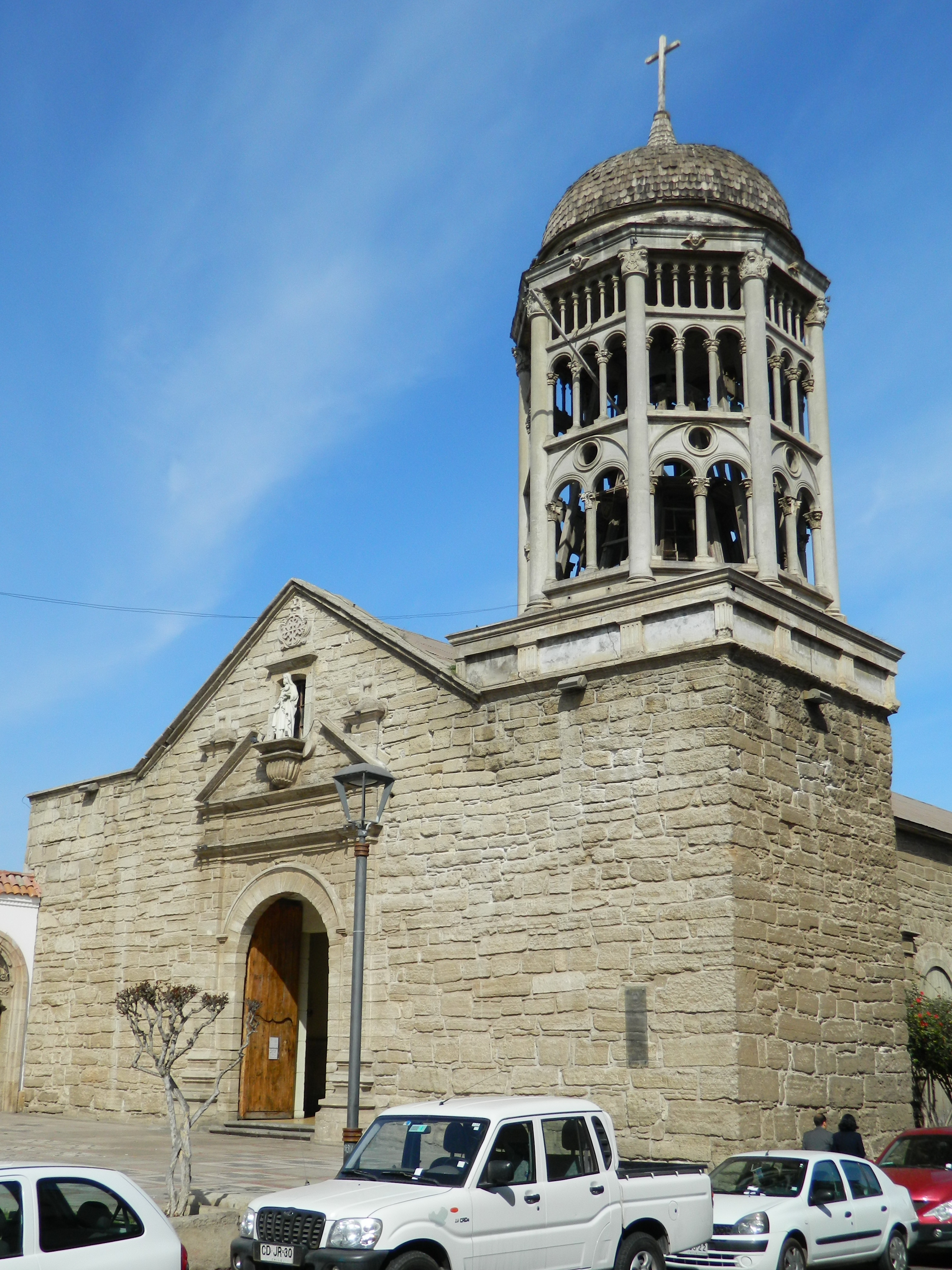
Front facade and the openwork bell tower

The church was rebuilt after the destruction and opened about 1775 due to the successful negotiations performed by Fraile Domingo Meneces, who obtained the funds necessary to complete the rebuilding of the church. Stones from the original church were used for its construction, as well as limestone quarried from Alto Peñuelas and wood from distant places.

A local legend tells that during the rebuilding of the church, destructive tidal waves threatened to devastate the city, because the waves reached the gully presently-named Santo Domingo. The statue of Our Lady of the Rosary was taken out of the church by the scared citizens and was carried in procession. The waters, which had reached 1 mile inland, returned to normal due to the presence of the statue.

On January 1, 1801, a strong earthquake hit La Serena, severely damaging the church. It had to be restored and some sections rebuilt.

Following the discovery of silver at Arqueros in 1825, the city boomed allowing the renovation of this and other churches in La Serena. A remodeling project was carried out in 1850 after another earthquake.

Between 1906 and 1911, the Belgian fathers executed a renovation project that included the plastering of exterior walls with cement mortar and the construction of a new tower. The church was restored again between 1961 and 1962. That time, the architect Eduardo Arancibia and the stonemason Luis Núñez removed the cement render from the exterior stone walls to restore the facade to its original appearance. Furthermore, the tower was repaired.

Over the course of the years, the church was staffed by the Carmelites and by the Diocesanos. The church is currently administered by the Instituto Secular Voluntas Dei under a concession agreement with the Dominicans.

== Architecture ==
The nave of the church is 45 m in length and 9 m in width. The main altar contains an image of Our Ldy of the Rosary. The side altars have statues of Saint Dominic and Francis of Assisi.

The church features a limestone facade. The front door is made of cedar wood, and is framed by pilasters and a broken pediment. There is a niche above the entrance containing a statue of Our Lady of the Rosary. The church is a Mannerist style building and has a bell tower that is eclectic in style.
