= Villa La Zambra =

Coordinates: 43.82808°N 11.21187°E

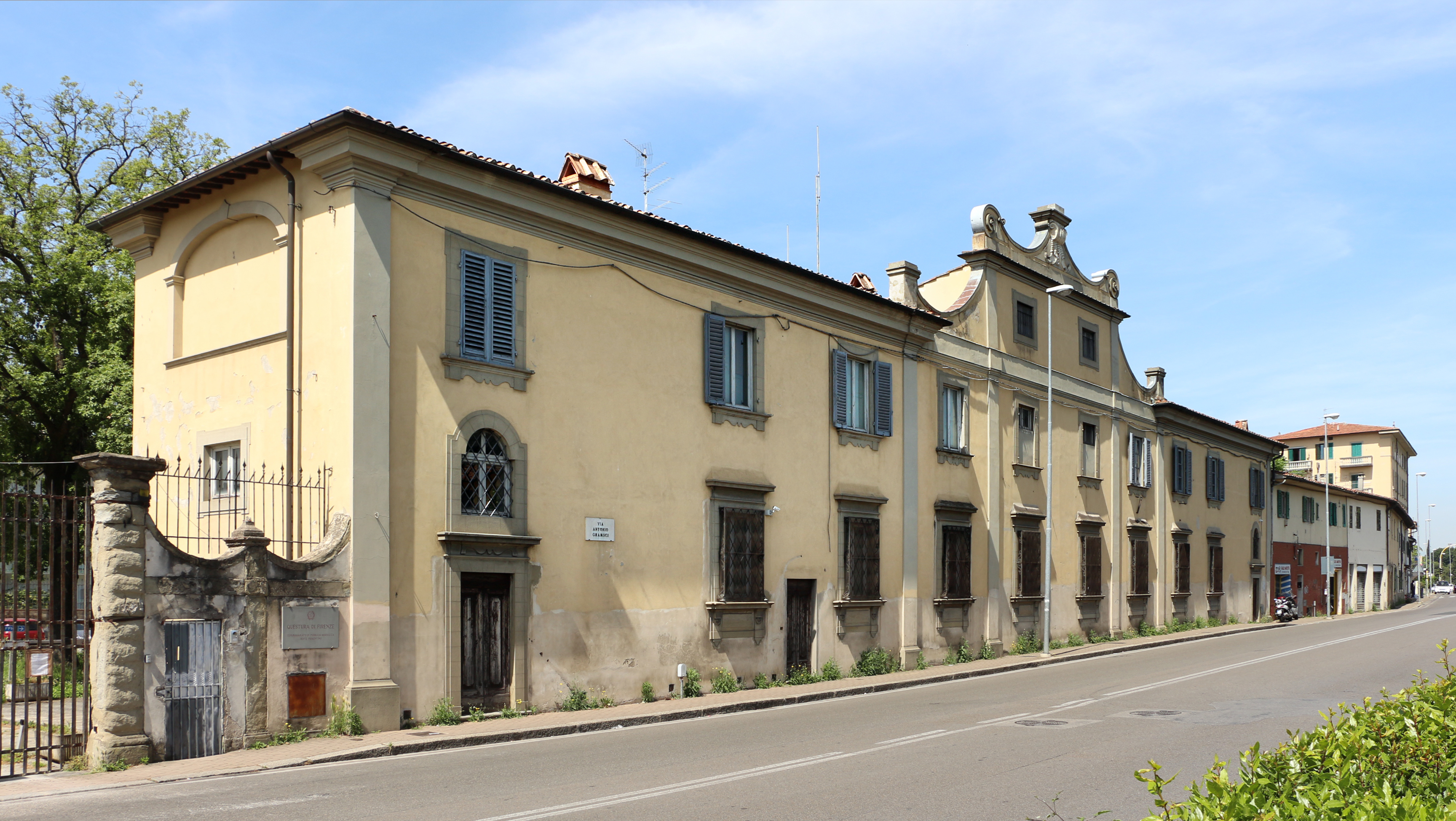
Facade along via Gramsci

The Villa La Zambra', also known as Villa Bianchini, is a Baroque style rural mansion, located on via Antonio Gramsci #522, just east of the center of Sesto Fiorentino, a commune in the Metropolitan City of Florence, region of Tuscany, Italy.

== History and description ==
Construction of the villa we see today was consolidated in the early 18th-century around a series of prior buildings documented since the 15th-century at the site. The Ginori family purchased the property and converted the buildings to the present state, as a wedding gift for Giovanni Giuseppe Ginori and Cassandra Ricasoli, who were married on 23 September 1721.

The villa now stands very near to the busy road with an elongated facade and wing extending at a right angle. The center of the facade culminates with a central tympanum flanked by curling volutes. The villa restored in the late 1990s and is rented to the Ministry of the Interior of Italy, Department of Public Security, Polizia di Stato.

The villa is noted for its frescoes by the Florentine painter Giovanni Antonio Pucci (1677–1739) who signed (1711) the canvas on the altar of the little private chapel inside the Villa.

== Sources ==
- "Il Paesaggio Riconosciuto" Edizioni Vangelista Milano 1984
- "The Florentine Villa: Architecture History Society" by Grazia Gobbi Sica.
