= Valeska Zambra =

Chilean physicist

- Born: 27 March 1994 (age 32); La Serena, Chile
- Education: University of Chile, Chile
- Known for: Chilean physicist who created an educative software on astronomy

Valeska Zambra (26 March 1994, La Serena, Chile) is a Chilean physicist specialised in the area of state of matter and strange matter.

== Early life and scientific career ==
Valeska Zambra has been interested in science since her first years of life. When she was only 12 years old she joined the Sciences Association of her school San Agustín in Copiapó (Chile).

She studied physics at the University of Chile, where she also completed a master's degree. In 2020 she moved to Vienna (Austria) to realize her PhD studies at the Institute of Science and Technology Austria (ISTA).

== Contributions ==
In 2011, when she was 17 years old, she developed an educative software on astronomy to detect and catalog stars and exoplanets. She named it Jana, the word in aymara language for sphere of the sky. She is a member of the Instituto Milenio de Investigación en Óptica (Millennium Institute for Research in Optics), from the Government of Chile. Valeska is interested in scientific divulgation and is involved in talks and workshops for children and adolescents. She has also participated in national and international congresses.

== Awards ==
She received the second place for the Chilean National Price in Scientific Education (category TICS) for her project with the software Jana and was awarded by the UNESCO in 2014 for the same project. She received the price Ernesto Gijoux for her remarkable curriculum at a very young age.

One of her microscopy images lead her to obtain a Honourable mention from the Royal Society of London (United Kingdom). In 2019 she was elected Joven Chilena del Año (Young Chilean of the year) for her contributions to research on liquid crystals.
