= List of copper smelters in Chile =

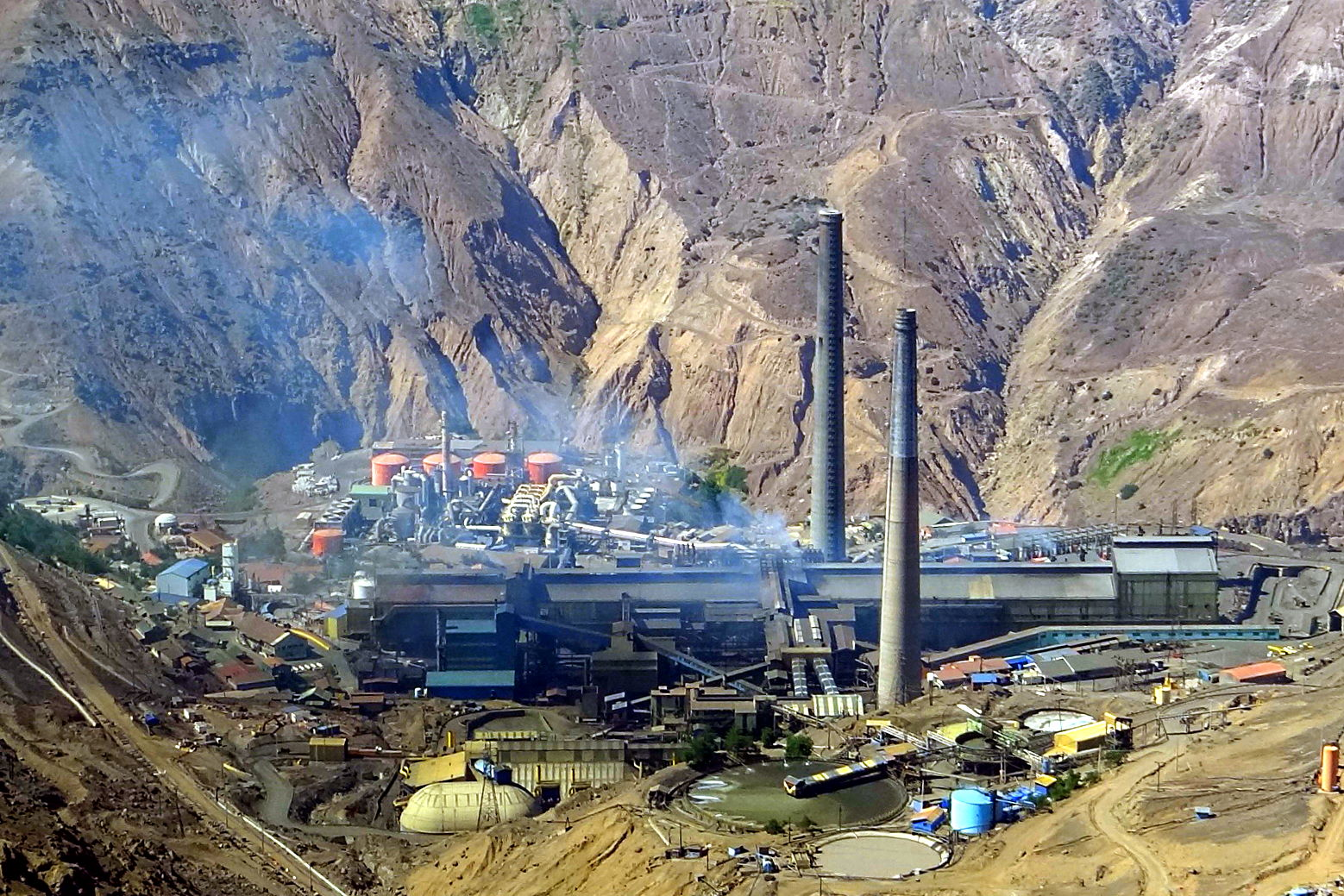
View of Codelco's Fundición Caletones smelter as of 2015 that serves El Teniente mine.

The following is a list of copper smelters in Chile that have been active at some point after 1950.

Chile is the world's largest producer of copper and activity provides a substantial part of the Chilean state's revenue: slightly less than 6% in 2020, with state-owned copper company Codelco alone generating 2.6% of state revenue. (Note: From 2001 to 2014 Codelco alone stood for 10% of the state's income.) In 2024 copper processed in Chilean copper smelters made up 33% of the value of Chilean mining products exports while unrefined copper concentrate represented 50.9% of the value of Chilean mining exports. Since the 1990s no new copper smelters have been built in Chile.

Copper smelters that serves a specific mine is called integrated smelters. A custom copper smelter is one receiving or open to receive ores from multiple mines. Thus, these smelters tend to be less fine-tuned than smelters integrated with specific mines. Custom smelters tend also to be located at strategic locations, such as near port facilities or at important crossroads in mining districts.

Copper smelters in Chile
Name	Type	Region	Year of opening	Capacity kTon/year as of 2015	Commentary
Fundición Altonorte	Custom	Antofagasta	1993	350	Fundición Altonorte is a copper smelter plant in La Negra, 25 km southeast of the city of Antofagasta in northern Chile. Owned by Glencore.
Fundición Caletones	Integrated–El Teniente	O'Higgins	1922	400	It is owned by Codelco and serves the mine of El Teniente. The smelter is the birthplace of the Teniente Converter technology, the first of which begun operations in 1977.
Fundición Chagres	Integrated–El Soldado	Valparaíso	1917	140	It is majority-owned by Anglo American Sur. It lies at 400 meters above sea level and reported to produce 110,100 tons of copper anodes in 2023.
Fundición Chuquicamata	Integrated–Chuquicamata	Antofagasta	1952	450	It is owned by Codelco and serves the mine of Chuquicamata.
Fundición Paipote	Custom	Atacama	1952	84 (Note: A USD 1,700 million overhaul plan consider a new cathode production capacity of 240 million tons per year. Up to February 2024 it had production capacity of 84 million tons annually.)	Fundicón Paipote is a copper smelter plant owned by ENAMI near Copiapó. The smelter has been paralyzed since February 2024 for a major overhaul. At the time of paralization the smelter generated economic losses for ENAMI.
Fundición Potrerillos	Integrated–El Salvador	Atacama	1928	177	It is owned by Codelco and serves El Salvador mine. In the early 2020s Codelco has recognised limited automation and increased environmental regulations as challenges for the viability of Fundición Potrerillos.
Fundición Ventanas	Custom	Valparaíso	1964	105	Fundición Ventanas was a copper smelter plant in Quintero, Valparaíso Region, Chile. It is owned by Codelco and was formerly owned by ENAMI. It closed permanently in 2023.

== New copper smelter ==
Since the closure of Codelco's Fundición Ventanas in Valparaíso Region in 2022–2023 Antofagasta Region and Atacama Region haves been proposed by Chilean industry scholars as locations for a viable replacement. Others have argued for keeping smelting in Valparaíso Region given the existence of nearby mines. While some argue the replacement plant should be near the coast, inland Chuquicamata and El Salvador have also been proposed as alternatives. The president of the National Mining Society (Sonami), Diego Hernández, estimates the construction period for a new smelter plant to be 5 to 7 years. A 2024 study identified Antofagasta Region as the best place for a new copper smelter given logistical advantages and an existing and expandable supply of copper concentrate from nearby mines. In December 2025 Codelco signed a memorandum of understanding with Glencore to establish a new copper smelter in Antofagasta Region. According to this plan the project will be submitted for approval to the Environmental Assessment Service in 2028 and construction of the smelter will begin in 2030 and it would then begin operations in 2032 or 2033.
