= Fundición Potrerillos =

Copper smelting plant in Atacama, Chile

Coordinates: 26°26′10.49″S 69°28′46.05″W

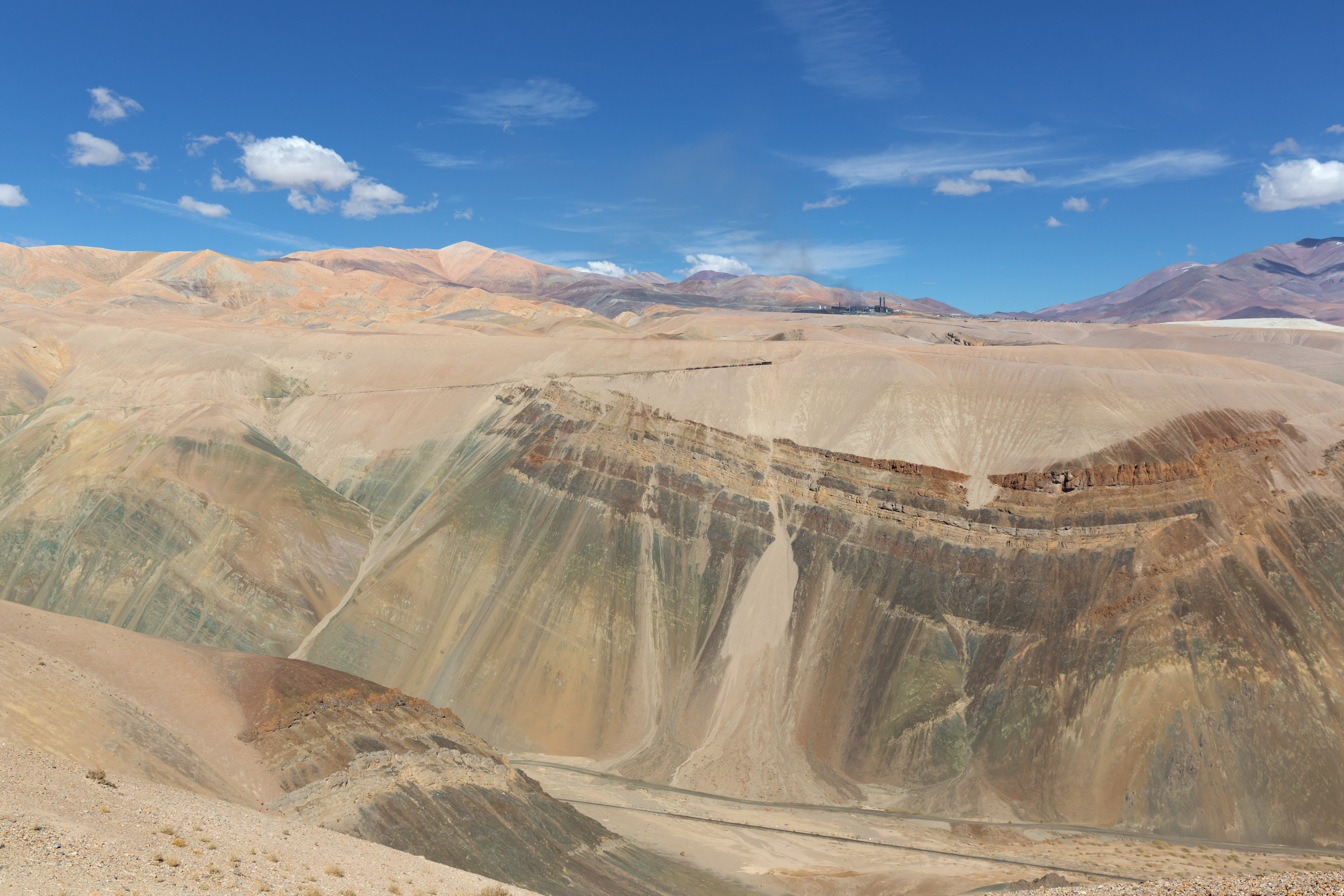
Fundicón Potrerillos seen in the background. In the foreground a Ferronor GR12U train climbing a grade.

Fundición Potrerillos is a copper smelter plant next to the town of Potrerillos in Chile's Atacama Region. The smelter is integrated with the copper mine of El Salvador, and both are owned by Codelco. It has a capacity to produce 177 kTon yearly of cathode copper. Fundición Potrerillos entered operations in 1927 under the ownership of Andes Copper Mining Company. The smelter has sulphur capture efficiency of 95%. The smelter operates with one Teniente Converter (TC), three Peirce Smith converter (PSC) and two rotary Slag Cleaning Furnaces (SCF).

The smelter has for decades had an overcapacity and from 2011 to 2014 it processed ore concentrate from Escondida following an agreement between Minera Escondida and Codelco. (Note: During that period a systematic theft of copper concentrate totalling US$10.4 million (as of 2016) worth was carried out by unloading during transport to Fundición Potrerillos and replacing it with tailings and concrete debris.)

In the mid-2020s Codelco has recognised limited automation and increased environmental regulations as challenges for the viability of Fundición Potrerillos.

In 2025, and in particular after the collapse of a chimney in June that year, there have been calls within Codelco to close the smelter.

== See also ==
- List of copper smelters in Chile
- Planta de Pellets
