= Fundición Chagres =

Copper smelter in Chile

Coordinates: 32.8038°S 70.9583°W

Fundición Chagres is a copper smelter plant in Valparaíso Region, Chile. As of 2025 it is one of Chile's five functional copper smelters, Chile being the world's largest producer of copper. The smelter is owned by Anglo American Sur, a joint venture owned in half by Anglo American plc. It lies at 400 m (1,300 ft) above sea level and reported to produce 110.1 kTons of copper anodes in 2023. It has a smelting capacity of 560 to 600 kTon per year but produced in the early to mid-2010s 140 to 145 kTon copper per year. The residual slag produced at Fundición smelter had as of 2009 copper contents of 3±0.1% Cu. With a sulphur emission capture rate of over 96% Fundición Chagres has the highest sulphur capture rate of any copper smelter in Chile.

Together with Fundición Altonorte they are two only private-owned copper smelters in Chile, while the remaining five are owned by state-owned Codelco or ENAMI. The smelter operates with three Peirce Smith converter (PSC) and two rotary Slag Cleaning Furnaces (SCF).

Fundición Chagres started operations in 1927 but closed in 1945 and then re-opened in 1956.

The smelter had as of January 2024 a permanent workforce of 323 employees and 230 contractors.

While Fundición Chagres held The Copper Mark environmental certificate as of 2022, in 2021 it was estimated that the smelter would require a series of improvements to comply with new Chilean environmental legislation.

== See also ==
- Alexander Sutulov
- Copper mining in Chile
- List of copper smelters in Chile
- Pollution in Quintero and Puchuncaví
