= Fundición Chuquicamata =

Coordinates: 22.314187°S 68.885462°W

Fundición Chuquicamata is a copper smelter plant in the interior of Atacama Desert in Chile's Antofagasta Region in the Calama commune. The smelter is integrated with the nearby copper mine of Chuquicamata, and both are owned by Codelco. As of 2024 it is one of three copper smelters owned by Codelco the others being Caletones and Potrerillos. The smelter operates with two Teniente Converters, three Peirce Smith converters and one Flash Smelting Furnance (FSF). It has a sulphur capture efficiency of about 95%. It had in the mid-2010s an annual smelting capacity of 1,400 kTon and an actual production of 450 kTon copper.

Until 1993 the smelter worked with reverberatory furnaces. The transition period from when the reverberatory furnances stopped working to the onset of efficient Peirce Smith converter operation later in the decade yielded much high-grade cold scrap.
