= Fundición Altonorte =

Copper smelting plant in La Negra, Chile

Coordinates: 23.8245°S 70.3172°W

Complejo Metalúrgico Altonorte
- Company type: Subsidiary
- Industry: Mining
- Predecessor: Refimet
- Founded: 1993 in La Negra, Chile
- Key people: Juan Carrasco Palma (CEO)
- Products: Copper cathode Sulphuric acid
- Owner: Glencore
- Number of employees: 750 (2023)
- Parent: Glencore

Fundición Altonorte or Complejo Metalúrgico Altonorte is a copper smelter plant in La Negra, 25 km southeast of the city of Antofagasta in northern Chile. Owned by Glencore, it is classified as a "custom smelter" as it does not depend on ore concentrate from a particular mine nor does it lie next to one. In 2015 it had a capacity to produce 350,000 metric tons of copper yearly making it the third largest of Chile's seven copper smelters. This capacity made Fundición Altonorte one of the world's 20 largest copper smelters. Besides copper Fundición Altonorte also produces sulfuric acid.

By 2023 it operated with 750 employees and 323 employees from contractors. Its CEO is Juan Carrasco Palma.

The smelter was established in 1993 and was by then known as Refimet. In 1998 its property was fully acquired by Noranda and it changed name to Fundición Altonorte, and in 2006 Glencore gained total ownership of it. Reportedly, the initial investment in the smelter came as result of the Decreto Ley 600 law of 1974 which sought incentivize foreign investment in Chile.

The smelter operates with a Norada reactor, three Peirce Smith converter (PSC) and a slag flotation facility.

== See also ==
- Alexander Sutulov – Chilean-Russian extractive metallurgist
- Alumysa – aluminium smelting project in Chile by Noranda, shelved in 2003
- Copper mining in Chile
- Guixi Smelter – largest copper smelter in the world
