= Fundición Caletones =

Smelting hut

Coordinates: 34°6′22.09″S 70°27′1.21″W

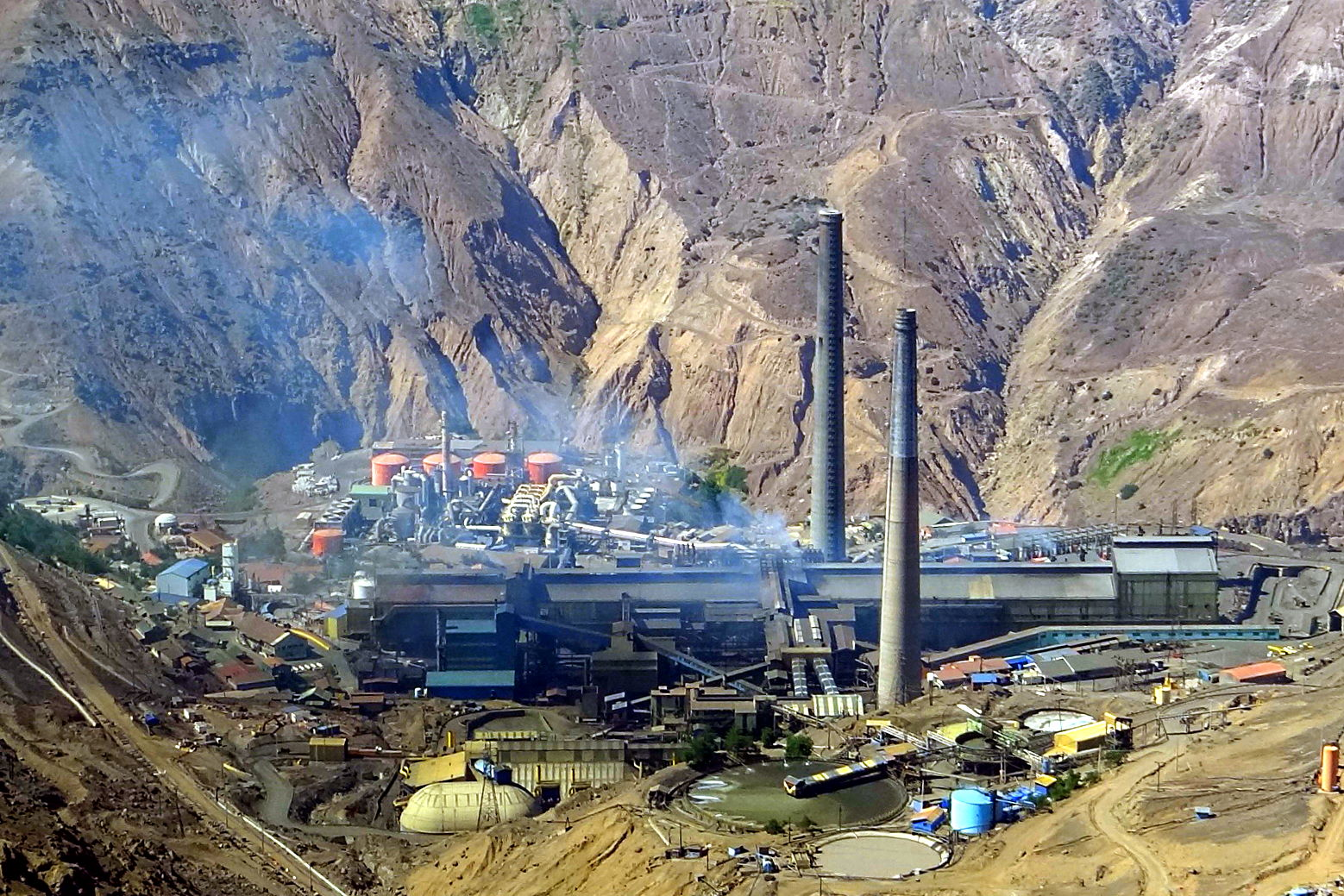
View of Codelco's Fundición Caletones smelter as of 2015 that serves El Teniente mine.

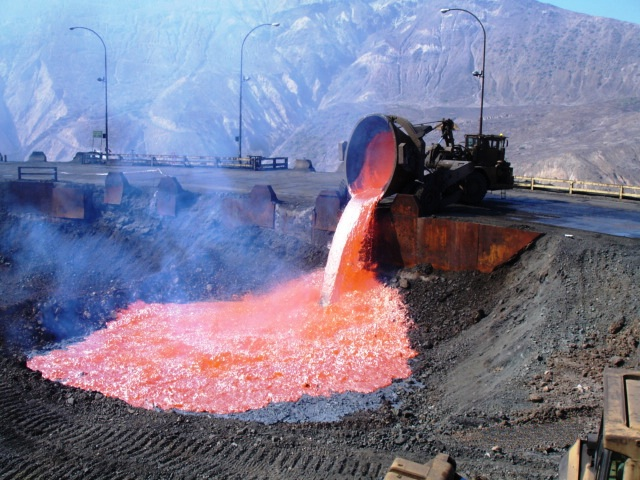
Molten slag disposal in Fundición Caletones in 2005.

Fundición Caletones or simply Caletones is a copper smelter plant in the Andes of Central Chile in Chile's O'Higgins Region in the Machalí commune. The smelter is integrated with the nearby copper mine of El Teniente, and both are owned by Codelco. After a failed attempt in the 1960s to expand the capacity using Peirce Smith converters (PSC) Caletones developed its own smelting technology becoming the birthplace of the Teniente Converter (TC), the first of which began operations in 1977.

At present Caletones has the capacity to each year process 1360 to 1400 kTon of concentrates and to produce 400 to 435 kTon cathode copper. As of 2015 it ranked second in Chile and among the 20 largest copper smelters in the world in terms of production capacity.

The smelter operates with two Teniente Converters, four Peirce Smith converters and four rotary Slag Cleaning Furnaces (SCF). It has a sulphur capture efficiency of 94-95%.

== See also ==
- List of copper smelters in Chile
