= Daniel Aguilera =

Chilean footballer (born 1988)

Personal information
- Full name: Daniel Andrés Aguilera Godoy
- Date of birth: 30 July 1988 (age 38)
- Place of birth: El Salvador, Chile
- Height: 1.75 m (5 ft 9 in)
- Position: Defender

Senior career*
Years	Team	Apps	(Gls)
2009–2012	Cobresal		
- * Club domestic league appearances and goals as of 22 March 2020

Daniel Aguilera (born 30 July 1988) was a Chilean footballer.

He played for Cobresal.
