= Potrerillos, Chile =

Ghost town in the Atacama Region, Chile

Coordinates: 26.4342°S 69.4833°W

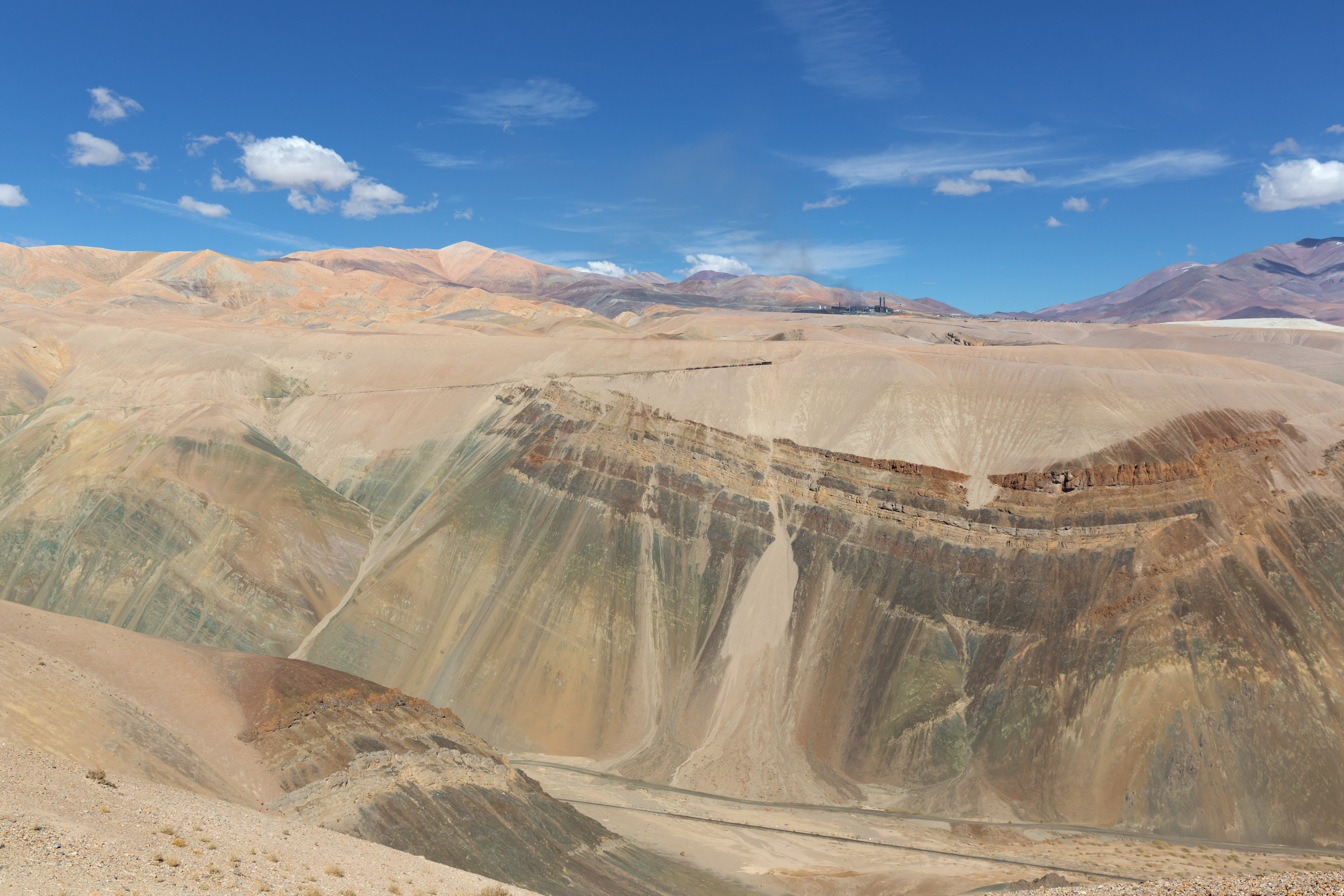
Ferronor GR12U climbing the grade to Potrerillos (in the background)

Potrerillos is a ghost town in the interior of Atacama Region, Chile. Potrerillos became established as mining camp in the 1920s by Andes Copper Mining Company.

The town is home to the copper smelter of Fundición Potrerillos established in 1927 and currently owned by Codelco and processing the ores of El Salvador.

There is an airport in the area, the Potrerillos Airport.

== Potrerillos Mine ==
One of Chile's Gran Mineria, the copper porphyry mine was identified and developed by William Burford Braden. The mine was active from 1927 until 1959.

=== Geology ===
Located 12 km east of the Sierra del Castillo fault, the area consists of Jurassic to Lower Cretaceous marine and volcanic host rocks. During the Late Eocene, the Porfido Cobre intrusion induced Cu-Mo mineralization. The supergene oxidation zone "is dominated by malachite and azurite in and around the Porfido Cobre stock."

== Potrerillos Library ==
In 1956, the people residing in Potrerillos, which consisted of mostly Americans, requested that the company Andes Copper Company approve a project for starting a library. The company approved the project and quickly a committee of camp women began asking the Potrerillos residents for donations. The project was on its way. The company made a vacant house available for the trial library. The library had over 1,000 donations and the organization of the library would be led by a previous librarian. They classified the books using the Dewey Decimal System and created book cards and date slips and added pockets for all the books. The families that resided in the area had no access to TVs and the radio signals were unreliable. The community had a great response to the work done by the committee. The library began by charging 5 and 10 pesos (equivalent to 1 cent and 2 cents) for daily rental. The funds began to accumulate and soon enough the committee was able to purchase new titles. The library was run by volunteers acting as librarians and was open one hour a night, three nights a week. The location soon had to be changed because of housing shortages. The Andes Copper Company recognized that the library was imperative to the community and decided to build a permanent building for the library in the school, which was used by the children of the workers. The new building received new shelves, desks and fluorescent lighting was installed. The directors of the company even began a fund for new books. The library was expanded and new U.S. titles continued to be purchased.

== Climate ==
Climate data for Portrerillos, elevation 2,850 m (9,350 ft)
| Month | Jan | Feb | Mar | Apr | May | Jun | Jul | Aug | Sep | Oct | Nov | Dec | Year |
|---|---|---|---|---|---|---|---|---|---|---|---|---|---|
| Mean daily maximum °C (°F) | 18.7 (65.7) | 18.7 (65.7) | 18.4 (65.1) | 17.6 (63.7) | 15.7 (60.3) | 13.2 (55.8) | 13.8 (56.8) | 14.3 (57.7) | 15.7 (60.3) | 16.5 (61.7) | 17.7 (63.9) | 18.5 (65.3) | 16.6 (61.8) |
| Daily mean °C (°F) | 13.6 (56.5) | 13.4 (56.1) | 13.1 (55.6) | 12.1 (53.8) | 10.0 (50.0) | 7.7 (45.9) | 8.2 (46.8) | 8.5 (47.3) | 10.0 (50.0) | 11.5 (52.7) | 13.1 (55.6) | 14.0 (57.2) | 11.3 (52.3) |
| Mean daily minimum °C (°F) | 9.6 (49.3) | 9.6 (49.3) | 9.1 (48.4) | 8.2 (46.8) | 6.4 (43.5) | 4.0 (39.2) | 4.6 (40.3) | 4.6 (40.3) | 5.9 (42.6) | 7.0 (44.6) | 8.4 (47.1) | 9.3 (48.7) | 7.2 (45.0) |
| Average precipitation mm (inches) | 1.2 (0.05) | 2.4 (0.09) | 2.0 (0.08) | 1.8 (0.07) | 11.5 (0.45) | 11.3 (0.44) | 8.3 (0.33) | 11.0 (0.43) | 1.1 (0.04) | 1.5 (0.06) | 0.1 (0.00) | 0.0 (0.0) | 52.2 (2.04) |
| Average relative humidity (%) | 38 | 38 | 35 | 25 | 24 | 25 | 24 | 24 | 21 | 23 | 23 | 29 | 27 |
Source: Bioclimatografia de Chile

== See also ==
- Los Pelambres
- Chañarcillo
- Escondida
