= Chilean nationalization of copper =

State acquisition process (1950s-1971)

The nationalization of the Chilean copper industry, commonly described as the Chilenization of copper (Spanish: Chilenización del cobre) was the process by which the Chilean government acquired control of the major foreign-owned section of the Chilean copper mining industry. It involved the three large world-class mines known as 'La Gran Mineria' and three smaller operations. The Chilean-owned smaller copper mines were not affected. The process started under the government of President Carlos Ibáñez del Campo (1952–1958), and culminated during the government of President Salvador Allende (1970–1973), who completed the nationalization. This "act of sovereignty" was the espoused basis for a later international economic boycott, which further isolated Chile from the world economy, worsening the state of political polarization that led to the 1973 Chilean coup d'état.

Concurrent with the nationalization of copper there was also a nationalization of steelmaking and iron mines in Chile in 1971.

== The mines involved in the nationalization ==
By the late 1950s, the three principal copper mines in Chile were Chuquicamata, El Salvador, and El Teniente. Chuquicamata and El Salvador were owned by the Anaconda Copper Company and El Teniente was owned by the Kennecott Copper Corporation. The La Exotica mine, an adjunct of Chuquicamata, was added to these big mines in 1966. These large mines were mainly self-contained and self-sustaining settlements with their own cities to house their workers, their own water and electrical plants, their own schools, stores, railways, and even in certain cases their own police forces.

Three other mines were eventually nationalized, Cerro de Pasco's Andina operation, which went to Codelco, and the two mines, Los Bronces and El Soldado, owned by Peñarroya's Disputada de las Condes, which were bought by ENAMI. Evidently these mines did not fit in with ENAMI's plans and Disputada de las Condes was subsequently sold (at a substantial profit) to Exxon Minerals.

== Second stage of nationalization ==
On June 26, 1969, President Eduardo Frei Montalva signed an agreement with the Anaconda Copper Company, the Kennecott Utah Copper company, and the Cerro company (which was afterwards ratified by Congress). In this agreement, the government acquired the 51% of the Kennecott’s shares and 25% of the shares in both Anaconda and Cerro, allowing the U.S. to maintain some level of control in this economic sector.

This process was known as "negotiated nationalization", and was designed to avoid a conflict with international investors (and ultimately with the United States) and to allow for the acquisition of the technical, financial and marketing knowledge of the multinationals. A similar process was used to acquire a dominant ownership over the rest of the copper industry.

In the agreement, it was established that the Chilean government could buy within the next 13 years (counting from 1970) the remaining 49% of the foreign ownership from the multinational corporations, but only after having paid at least 60% of the current debt due from the purchase of the original 51%. It also fixed a clear formula for the valuation of the assets to be bought, for the liquidation of profits, for the increase of direct investment in new works, and related issues.

== Third stage of nationalization ==
The process of "negotiated nationalization" met with vociferous criticism from the leftist political parties, and from a section of the President's own Christian Democratic Party. The idea was accused of bowing to American imperialism, being too slow and too expensive.

In the 1970 presidential election, the outright nationalization without compensation (known as the Chileanization of copper) became one of the main campaign issues. Two out of the three presidential candidates incorporated the idea into their political platforms, while the third opted for a faster version of the "negotiated nationalization".

After socialist candidate Salvador Allende won the election, he promised to deal with the issue head-on. In fact, at the beginning of 1971, he sent Congress a bill for a constitutional amendment that would allow him to nationalize outright all mines, and to transfer all present and future copper fields to the state. Congress passed this amendment on July 11, 1971, by a unanimous vote, and based on it, on July 16, 1971 law 17.450 was promulgated, and became effective immediately. The event was celebrated as the Day of National Dignity (Spanish: Día de la Dignidad Nacional).

In principle, there was complete agreement about the process of nationalization of the mines among all political parties represented in the Chilean Congress, as indicated by the unanimous vote that approved law 17.450. When it came down to the particulars, however, there was much concern about the political use that the Allende administration would make of it. Even so, the bigger concern was for the expected reaction of the U.S. government.

=== Compensation ===
Originally, the expropriation was based on the book value of the properties. Nevertheless, the Allende administration introduced the idea of "excessive profits" into the calculation of indemnification for the mines. This idea was based on the concept that the multinational corporations had reaped profits far in excess of what was considered "normal business practice". The way this was done was by comparing copper profits in Chile with the companies' profits elsewhere in the world. It was calculated that twelve percent was the worldwide profit rate for these companies, and that they had made $774 million above this in Chile from 1955 to 1970: "This deduction exceeded the book value of the companies' properties."

=== Aftermath ===
The nationalized Chilean mines were kept under state control after Pinochet's 1973 Chilean coup d'état, despite the junta being heavily assisted by the United States via the CIA. However, the Pinochet regime agreed to pay Anaconda over $250 million in compensation. The mines are still nationalized up to this day, largely because of public sentiment and because Codelco is a major contributor to the Chilean Exchequer. Codelco pays income tax; all dividends go to the government and it also pays a 10% tax on the export value of copper products and associated byproducts according to Law 13,136.

Article 1 of the Chilean Mining Code states that "The State has absolute, exclusive, inalienable and imprescriptible ownership of all mines" but goes on to say that anyone may prospect for and establish concessions or mining rights for the search or mining of substances. As well as the Mining Code, foreign investors have to observe Decree Law No. 600 which deals with foreign investment and investment contracts. This allows tax invariability for 10 years from start of production, access to the foreign exchange market and the right to return capital actually brought into the country without being taxed. The tax invariability can be extended to 20 years for companies bringing in US$50 million or more. In return for these concessions foreign investors have to pay a combined tax rate of 42% compared with the current 35%. They may change, but once only, to the current mining tax regime but most have opted for the higher tax rate because it gives more certainty to financial planning.

On June 16, 2005, Law 20.026 was published in Chile's Official Gazette (Diario Oficial). The Law establishes a specific tax on mining activities, which came in force on January 1, 2006 consisting of a sliding scale according to copper production from nothing below 12,000 tonnes p.a. to 5% above 50,000 tonnes p.a. on production in excess of 12,000 tonnes p.a. Foreign companies that signed a DL 600 contract before Dec 1 2004 and are still liable to 42% tax are not affected by this. Companies bringing in US$50 million or more now can be granted invariability of mining taxation but must pay normal income tax. They must also submit their annual financial statements to external audit and to the Securities and Insurance Supervisor as well as their quarterly statements and an annual report on the property.

Mining companies are generally granted concessions to allow them to recoup their initial capital expenditures because of the risky nature of mining. The most important of these in Chilean law are organisation and startup expenses, interest expense, technical assistance, tax losses and asset depreciation, which may be accelerated. This gives rise to a long initial tax free period and the suspicion that they are avoiding tax.

== See also ==
- Project Cybersyn
- Military dictatorship of Chile
- Miracle of Chile
