= Junín mine =

Copper mine in Manabí, Ecuador

- Location: Manabí Province, Ecuador
- Products: Copper

The Junín mine is a large copper mine located in the west of Ecuador in Manabí Province. Junín represents one of the largest copper reserve in Ecuador and in the world having estimated reserves of 982 million tonnes of ore grading 0.89% copper, 0.04% molybdenum and 59.7 million oz of silver.

== See also ==
- Mining in Ecuador
