= El Salvador mine =

- Location in Chile El Salvador mine (Chile)
- Location: El Salvador, Diego de Almagro, Chile; 26°14′30″S 069°33′26″W
- Products: Copper
- Production: 5,700 tonnes
- Financial year: 2024
- Opened: 1959
- Closed: 2026–2031
- Company: Codelco
- Acquired: 1971 (Chilean nationalization of copper)

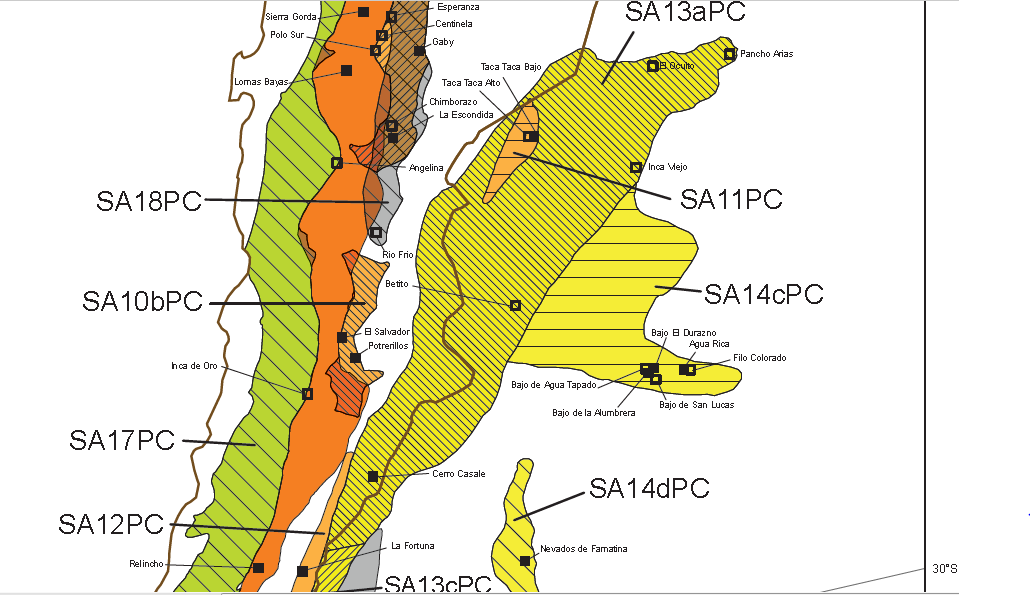
Location of the El Salvador and Potrerillos copper mines in Chile

El Salvador mine (The Savior) is a combined open pit and underground copper mine located in Chile and owned by the state owned copper mining company Codelco. The mine is located next to the company town of El Salvador.

The mine was originally built by The Anaconda Company in the late 1950s, but in 1971, with the nationalization of the copper industry in Chile, full ownership of the mine was turned over to the newly formed, state owned copper mining company Codelco.

Codelco had planned to close the El Salvador mine in 2011, but extended the mine life by an additional 15–20 years. El Salvador operates as Codelco's smallest mine with the highest cash costs.

== History ==
The El Salvador mine was developed by The Anaconda Company. Production at the mine began in 1959, and was intended to replace production of the company's Potrerillos mine, which would be closing due to a decline in ore quality. Production from the El Salvador would increase Chile's total output of copper to about 450,000 tons of copper per year. Rather than a decrease in production, out of satisfaction and relief, the company renamed the mine El Salvador, Spanish The Savior. When President Salvador Allende nationalized the Chilean copper mining industry and Codelco was formed in 1971, the El Salvador mine, (and other mines owned by Anaconda, and Kennecott Copper Corporation) became property of Codelco. After the military led coup by Augusto Pinochet in 1973, the mines were not returned to the companies. However, Chile did reimburse losses (in part) to Anaconda and Kennecott.

In 1989 the mines production rate of 120,000 tonnes (130,000 short tons) of refined copper accounted for 1.7% of the world's copper supply (seven million tons produced globally). The El Salvador mine is Codelco's smallest operation and has the highest cash costs per pound of copper, $0.72 in 2005, (an increase from $0.66 in 2004), compared to a company wide $0.44 per pound. El Salvador produced 5.7 tonnes (6.3 short tons) of copper in 2024 of Codelco's total production of 1,428.7 tonnes (1,574.9 short tons) that year.

In 2005 Codelco had planned to shut down the El Salvador mine in 2011 because of declining ore grades and increased costs, but extended the project life by an additional 15–20 years.

== Geology ==
"El Salvador represents the southernmost point of the giant porphyry copper districts of the Atacama Desert." Located 10 km west of the Sierra del Castillo fault, it consists of Paleocene volcanic host rocks. During the Eocene, dacite stocks induced Cu-Mo mineralization.

== Labour disputes ==
As of 2007 Codelco employed 17,000 direct-hire company employees and 28,000 contract employees across all their operations. There have been multiple labour disruptions at the El Salvador mine.

=== 1983 ===
In 1983 El Teniente and two other Codelco mines closed when approximately 13,000 workers voted to strike "indefinitely" in protest of a union leaders arrest for calling for an end to military rule in Chile. Between the three mines at least 3,300 workers and 37 labour leaders were fired for participating in the strike.

=== 1989 ===
A strike occurred at the El Salvador mine in September 1989, it coincided with a strike at Highland Valley Copper in British Columbia, Canada. There was little market reaction to the end of the strike as several other copper mines had ceased production due to bankruptcy, terrorism, weather or labour disruptions.

=== 2007 ===
In 2007, contract workers halted production at the El Salvador mine on 16 June 2007. The roads to the mine were blocked by striking contract workers and stopped company employees from reaching production areas, and union officials indicated that there would be blockades at Codelco's other mines. The contract workers were demanding the same production bonuses, health care, housing and education benefits that company employees received. An agreement was reached between Codelco and the union on 27 July 2007. Disruptions at the El Salvador mine and other Codelco properties, coupled with production disruptions in Canada caused a 22% increase in the price of copper in 2007.

=== 2008 ===
In 2008, contract workers at the El Salvador and four other Codelco mines went on strike, suspending production on 16 April. They demanded that Codelco fulfil agreements reached the year before regarding increases in pay and improvement of working conditions. Protests by contract workers blocked access to the mine and severe damage to the mine resulted, due to loads borne on columns not designed to support weight for extended periods of time. This resulted in unstable conditions within the mine (as reported by an external consulting firm hired by Codelco). The mine was the victim of sabotage. Important electrical and water supply equipment was set on fire, which endangered the distribution of electricity and drinkable water to the mines, resulting in a delay of operations. The strike resulted in reduced production by the mining company (1,000 tonnes (1,100 short tons)) of copper (8,000 tonnes (8,800 short tons)) planned for the month of July.

== See also ==
- Copper mining in Chile
- El Teniente
- Chuquicamata
- Los Pelambres mine
- Chañarcillo
- Escondida
