= Decreto Ley 600 =

Decreto Ley 600 is a Chilean law issued by the Government Junta of Chile in July 1974 to establish a new regulatory framework for direct foreign investment aiming to attract investment to Chile. It is considered an important milestone in the transformation of the Chilean economy that led it to become more export-oriented, and was reportedly also part of the rise of "neoliberalism" in the country. Most investment in mining done under the regime of Decreto Ley 600 came from the companies based in the United States.

The favourable conditions established by Decreto Ley 600 attracted the companies Falconbridge and Superior Oil which formed the joint venture Consorcio de Exploración Doña Inés in the 1970s which explored for mineral resources in the Quebrada Blanca area in northern Chile. Later the efforts of Consorcio de Exploración Doña Inés were directed at what was to become the Collahuasi mine. Other companies that begun investing in Chilean mining in the framework established by the law were Saint Joe Minerals in El Indio, Anaconda Company in Los Pelambres and EXXON Minerals in Disputada de Las Condes. This last company invested in Chile following a short-lived trend among oil companies to invest in copper mining, but then sold its assets.

The law is credited with attracting Noranda to invest in the copper smelter Refimet in the early 1990s and which it fully acquired in 1998 changing its name to Fundición Altonorte. Another result attributed to the decree is the dwarfing of traditional pirquinero mining activity relative to the new modern mining industry that was established in Chile in the late 20th century.
