= Cathode copper =

Metallurgical product

Cathode copper is copper with a purity of 99.99%, and is commonly produced in the form of rectangular copper plates with "ears" for handling. It is mainly produced via two different methods, one starting with copper oxide minerals and one from copper sulfide minerals. Copper sulfides go through a process of comminution and are then typically separated from gangue (and future tailings) by using froth flotation. The resulting copper concentrate is then smelted to produce anode copper which is then electrorefined to obtain cathode copper. Copper oxides are bleached and then processed with solvent extraction and electrowinning.

Cathode copper is used to produce ingots, billets, cakes and wire rods which are then used to produce copper wire.

== See also ==
- List of copper smelters in Chile
