= La Negra (industrial complex) =

- Industrial settlement
- Location within Chile
- Coordinates: 23°46′31″S 70°19′0″W
- Country: Chile
- Region: Antofagasta
- Province: Antofagasta
- Municipality: Antofagasta
- Elevation: 420 m (1,380 ft)

Population (2017)
  - Total: 60
- Time zone: UTC−4 (CLT)
  - Summer (DST): UTC−3 (CLST)

La Negra is a small industrial complex 22 km (14 mi) southeast of Antofagasta, Chile after crossing the coastal mountain range, in the Atacama Desert. The complex includes a lithium battery production facility. La Negra had 60 permanent residents as of 2017.

== Overview ==
Among La Negra industries, the two major ones are Altonorte, a copper smelter refinery, and Inacesa, a cement plant. It offers basic services for truckers and travelers in general. La Negra also has facilities for the processing of lithium concentrate obtained in Salar de Atacama.

La Negra is also the intersection of the Pan-American Highway and the road from Antofagasta to Escondida Mine. It has a station on the Salta–Antofagasta railway.

== Industry ==
There is a lithium production and battery conversion plant in the area, operated by Albemarle. In 2024, the facility was visited by United States Secretary of the Treasury Janet Yellen.

Austin Engineering operate a mining machinery manufacturing facility in La Negra.
