= Codelco =

Chilean copper company

Corporación Nacional del Cobre de Chile
- Type: State-owned enterprise
- Industry: Mining
- Founded: 1976
- Headquarters: Santiago, Chile
- Key people: Máximo Pacheco president of the board
- Products: Copper
- Revenue: ▲US$16.0 billion (2010)
- Net income: US$5.249 billion
- Number of employees: 17,880
- Website: www.codelco.com

The National Copper Corporation of Chile (Spanish: Corporación Nacional del Cobre de Chile), abbreviated as Codelco, is a Chilean state-owned mining company and the largest copper mining company in the world. (Note: Codelco has twice in recent years narrowly maintained its status as the world's largest copper mining company. In 2018, this was averted when Freeport-McMoRan relinquished shares in the Grasberg mine to the Government of Indonesia, and in 2024, it occurred again when BHP's attempt to acquire all shares of Anglo American collapsed.)

It was formed in 1976 from foreign-owned copper companies that were nationalised in 1971. As of 2025 its most productive mines are Radomiro Tomic and El Teniente.

In 2025, Codelco was the second largest copper producing company in the world, and produced 1.332 million tonnes of copper.

In 2007, it produced 1.66 million tonnes of copper, 11% of the world total. It then owned the world's largest known copper reserves and resources. At the end of 2007 it had a total of reserves and resources of 118 million tonnes of copper in its mining plan, sufficient for more than 70 years of operation at current production rates. It also identified additional resources of 208 million tonnes of copper, though one cannot say how much of this may prove economic.

Codelco's principal product is cathode copper. It is also one of the world's largest molybdenum producers, producing 27,857 fine metric tons in 2007, and is a large producer of rhenium, of which Chile is the world's largest producer. It also produces small amounts of gold and silver from refinery anode slimes, the residue from electro refining of copper.

Since at least 2004 the production levels of copper Codelco has stagnated or declined, with a significant decline from 2021 to 2023. The tonnage of copper produced in 2023 was 72% of that of 2004 and the decline affects all of Codelcos mining divisions, but originated in large part from geomechanical problems compromising the stability of three mines; El Teniente, Chuquicamata and Ministro Hales.

Following the launching of the National Lithium Strategy in 2023 Codelco has ventured into lithium mining. Codelco created in 2025 Nova Andino Litio as a joint venture with Sociedad Química y Minera (SQM) effectively taking over the latter's lithium brine mining operations in Salar de Atacama. In parallel, Codelco partnered in 2025 with Rio Tinto to mine lithium brines in Salar de Maricunga.

== History ==
Codelco's history begins with Law 11,828, of May 5, 1955, that created the Copper Office (Departamento del Cobre) of the Chilean government, approved under President Carlos Ibáñez del Campo. During the administration of President Eduardo Frei Montalva, Congress sanctioned Law 16,425, on January 25, 1966, and transformed the Copper Office into the Copper Corporation of Chile (Codelco).

With the constitutional reform that nationalized copper (Law 17,450 July 11, 1971), during President Salvador Allende's government, full ownership of all copper mines and copper fields in the country were transferred to Codelco. The creation of the Corporación Nacional del Cobre de Chile, as it is currently known, was formalized by decree of April 1, 1976, under the Augusto Pinochet dictatorship.

Codelco's symbol is based on the alchemical symbol for copper.

In 2026 the company was hit by a scandal in which it was suspected to have inflated production numbers for 2025. Consequently the Codelco ordered 6322 workers to return bonus payments related to that years performance. Concurrently, KPMG was contracted for a large-scale audit.

== The company ==
Location of Codelco's copper mines and its former custom smelter Fundición Ventanas closed in 2022. Note that Codelco own more copper smelters but these are usually integrated within the mines.

Codelco consists of research, exploration, acquisition and development departments. It has five principal operating divisions, Codelco Norte, Salvador, Andina, Ventanas and El Teniente, and a 49% interest in the El Abra Mine. It has several other potential mining operations under exploration and development including the Alejandro Hales, Gaby/Gabriela Mistral, the Toki Cluster, Mocha, and Casualidad projects. All excess profits go to the government, including a 10% tax on foreign currency sales (Law 13,196). In 2007 Codelco paid US$7.394 billion to the Chilean Treasury. Codelco has negotiated a 7-year US$3.0 billion syndicated loan which, with the US$1.96 billion in cash and cash equivalent at the end of 2007 leaves the corporation well placed to finance the several new projects that it is investigating.

== Corporate governance ==
The headquarters are in Santiago and the seven-man board of directors is appointed by the President of the Republic. It has the Minister of Mining as its president and six other members including the Minister of Finance and one representative each from the Copper Workers Federation and the National Association of Copper Supervisors. The company is allowed to sell its assets only with the approval of the Chilean Copper Commission, an independent technical agency.

== Divisions ==
=== Codelco Norte ===
Codelco Norte is a division of Codelco that is made of the Chuquicamata and Radomiro Tomic mining areas.

==== Chuquicamata ====
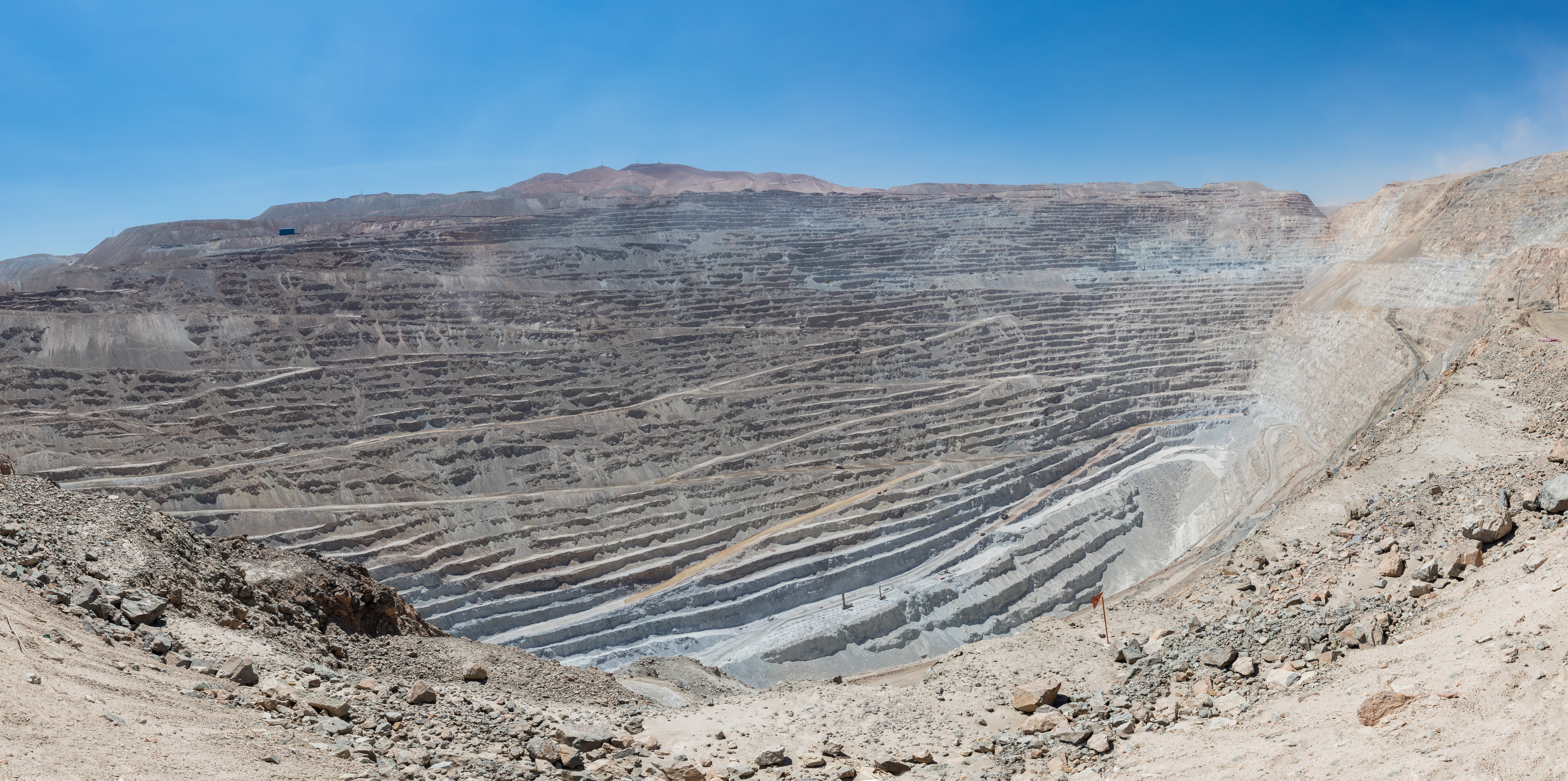
Chuquicamata mine in 2016

Copper has been mined for centuries at Chuquicamata as was shown by the discovery in 1898 of "Copper Man", a mummy dated at about 550 A.D. which was found trapped in an ancient mine shaft by a fall of rock. However mining on any scale did not start until the later years of the 19th century and these early operations mined the high grade veins (10-15% copper) and disregarded the low grade disseminated ore. One attempt was made to process the low grade ore in 1899-1900 by Norman Walker, a partner in La Compañia de Cobre de Antofagasta, but it failed leaving the company deeply in debt.

The modern era started when the American engineer Bradley finally developed a method of working low grade oxidised copper ores. In 1910 he approached the lawyer and industrialist Albert C Burrage who sent engineers to examine Chuquicamata. Their reports were good and in April 1911 he started to buy up mines and claims in association with Duncan Fox y Cia., an English entrepreneur.

Unfortunately, Burrage did not have the capital to develop a mine so he approached the Guggenheim Brothers. They examined his claims and estimated reserves at 690 million tonnes grading 2.58% copper. The Guggenheims also had a process for treating the low grade ores developed by E A Cappelen Smith and were immediately interested, organised the Chile Exploration Company (Chilex) in January 1912 and eventually bought out Burrage for US$25 million in Chilex stock.

===== The modern mine =====
Chilex then went ahead with the development and construction of a mine on the eastern section of the Chuquicamata field - it acquired the remainder gradually over the next 15 years - and a 10,000 tons per day leaching plant which was planned to produce 50,000 tons of electrolytic copper annually. Amongst the equipment purchased were steam shovels from the Panama Canal. A port and oil-fired power plant were built at Tocopilla, 90 miles to the west and an aqueduct was constructed to bring water in from the Andes. Production started on May 18, 1915. Actual production rose from 4345 tonnes in the first year to 50,400 tonnes in 1920 and 135,890 tonnes in 1929 before the Depression hit and demand fell. The Guggenheims gave up control of the mine in 1923 when they sold 51% to Anaconda Copper, which acquired most of the remainder in 1929. Anaconda ran the mine until the 1960s when the Chilean state acquired a 51% holding in the "Chilenization" of the copper industry. In 1971 the mine was nationalised and in 1976 was incorporated into Codelco.

Production from the capping of oxidised minerals, which required mere leaching in sulphuric acid to dissolve the copper and the recovery of the copper by electrolysis was the sole means of production until the 1950s. However their gradual depletion forced the construction of a mill and flotation plant in 1961 to treat the underlying secondary sulphides. These have been steadily expanded until recently the pit was producing over 600,000 tonnes of copper annually, though this has now fallen with the lower grades as the richer secondary mineralisation is also depleted in the three porphyries that make up the orebody.

The present mine is a conventional truck and shovel operation, with a large proportion of the ore crushed in-pit and transported by underground conveyors to the mill bins. The 182,000 tonnes p.a. concentrator is also conventional and is primary crushing followed by SAG mills and ball mills with cyclone classification. The flotation section produces both copper and molybdenum concentrates. The 1.65 million tonnes p.a. of concentrate are smelted in one Outokumpu flash smelter and one Teniente converter with electric furnace and cylindrical slag cleaning followed by four Pierce Smith converters. The blister copper goes to six anode furnaces which feed three anode casting wheels. The anodes go on to the 855,000 tonnes p.a. electrolytic refinery.

===== The future of Chuquicamata =====
Plans to go underground and mine the rest of the Chuquicamata orebody by block caving are now well advanced. At the SIMIN conference in 2007 in Santiago Codelco engineers detailed a possible future mining plan. The open pit is becoming gradually uneconomic and it was estimated that mining would slow down and stop by 2020. In the meantime the mill will be kept up to its 182,000 tonnes per day capacity with sulphides from Radomiro Tomic and Alejandro Hales. The underground mine will start up in 2018 and when it reaches full capacity of 120,000 tonnes per day in 2030, the balance of the tonnage will come from the Alejandro Hales underground mine. It is estimated that extractable underground reserves below the present pit total 1,150 million tonnes of ore grading 0.76% copper and 0.052% molybdenum.

This mine was, for many years, the world's largest annual producer until it was overtaken by Escondida. It was one of the largest copper mining excavations, producing over 29 million tonnes in total.

==== Radomiro Tomic ====
The Radomiro Tomic deposit, 5 km north of the main pit, was discovered in 1952 when Anaconda conducted an extensive churn drilling programme to explore for oxidised ore to the north of the Chuquicamata pit. It was named Chuqui Norte but they did not develop it, largely because the technology had not been developed, particularly SX/EW. Two smaller areas of interest were found and the overall results showed that the Chuquicamata complex of mineralised porphyries is no less than 14 km long.

The deposit is covered with some 100 metres of alluvium and in 1993/94 Codelco estimated a resource base for the operation of 802 million tonnes of oxide ore grading 0.59% copper and 1,600 million tonnes of refractory (sulphide) ore. The deposit covers an area of 5 km x 1.5 km.

Mining started in 1997 and is again a conventional truck and shovel operation followed by crushing, pre treatment and stacking before acid leaching. Copper is extracted by SX/EW. Leached ore is removed by bucket wheel excavator followed by secondary leaching. It is likely that the 'refractory' sulphide ore will be mined and used to keep the Chuquicamata mill full during the changeover to underground mining. The last published production by Radomiro Tomic, from Cochilco, was 379,600 tonnes in 2013.

==== Northern expansion of Mina Sur ====
Between the main pit and Mina Sur there remains a substantial tonnage of so-called exotic copper in the channel of paleogravels (ancient gravels) between the two and which were mined in Mina Sur. The minerals, thought to be deposited by colloidal copper solutions leached from the main deposit, included manganese bearing copper pitch and copper wad, along with other impurities which made the ore difficult to leach in the original vats and produced a substandard cathode. The 'exotic' ore is now being heap leached and the copper extracted by SX/EW which leaves the impurities behind in the leach solution. It is expected that this operation will produce 129,000 tonnes of good quality copper cathode annually.

==== Secondary waste dump leach ====
This is the leaching of certain copper bearing waste dumps and is expected to produce 26,000 tonnes of copper annually.

==== Ministro Hales ====
This is a major discovery that was made between Chuquicamata and Calama. It was initially estimated to have reserves of over 500 million tonnes grading over 1% copper, but was found to be geologically complex and have a high arsenic content and work was stopped on it for some years. Work resumed in 2000, as a result of the development of a process to treat high arsenic ores, the need for sulphide ore feed to the mill when Chuquicamata's mining goes underground and to test bioleaching technology. It is also possible that it may enable an expansion of the sulphide mill's capacity.

==== Pollution ====
For many years Chuquicamata, particularly its smelter, was a byword for pollution and the inhabitants of the Chuquicamata camp and Calama had serious amounts of arsenic in their blood. This has changed drastically. The camp at Chuquicamata has been closed and the inhabitants moved to Calama, away from the dust and general pollution close to the mine.

The off gasses from the flash smelter, Teniente converter and Pierce-Smith converters have a high enough sulphur dioxide content to allow sulphuric acid production in a single absorption sulphuric acid plant which has improved sulphur capture to 98%. The corporation also planned some years ago to reduce arsenic emissions by 97% but there have been no recent reports. Pollution of the River Loa, which flows through Calama is a problem which is being addressed but little has been reported.

=== Salvador ===
The El Salvador mine is a combined open pit and underground copper mine in the company town of El Salvador. The El Salvador mine was purchased by Anaconda Copper, who had little intention of mining it, due to high tax rates by the Chilean government. When the tax rates were reduced Anaconda decided to bring the mine into production. Production at the mine began in the early 1960s, and was intended to replace production of the company's Potrerillos mine, which would be closing. Production from the El Salvador would increase Chile's total output of copper about 450,000 tons of copper per year, rather than a decrease in production, out of satisfaction and relief, the company renamed the mine El Salvador, Spanish The Savior. In 2005 Codelco had planned to shut down the El Salvador mine in 2011 because of declining ore grades and increased costs, but extended the project life by an additional 15–20 years. They' also have a new project call San Antonio that would be located in the old mine at Potrerillos. The General Manager is Jaime Rojas, the General Counsel is Oscar Lira, the sustainability and external affairs manager y Rodrigo Vargas and the Human Resources manager is Ariel Guajardo.

=== Andina ===
Situated some 80 km northeast of the capital, Santiago, the Andina mine was discovered in 1920 but production did not start until 1970. It consists of the Rio Blanco underground (block cave) mine and the Sur Sur open pit and an underground concentrator. Unlike other Codelco mines, it does not have its own smelter. Geologically it consists of about half the Los Bronces-Rio Blanco complex of mineralised breccias, the other half being owned and mined by the Los Bronces mine of Compania Minera Disputada de la Condes which is in turn owned by Anglo American.

Originally owned by the American Cerro De Pasco Corporation, who brought the mine to production, it has been gradually built up by Codelco and is now the subject of a major expansion scheme. At the end of 2007, reserves and resources in the mining plan totalled 5,698 million tonnes grading 0.78% copper containing 44.3 million tonnes of metal and additional identified resources of 11,342 tonnes grading 0.52% copper containing 59.6 million tonnes of metal.

The orebodies are at considerable heights, between 3,000 and 4,200 metres and operations can be severely affected by the weather. Originally the mine was only the underground block cave and an underground concentrator with an "hotel" (bunkhouse) where the workers live when the Rio Blanco valley is impassable in the winter. Now the Sur Sur and Don Luis breccias above and to the south of the underground mine are being worked as open pits. Production in 2007 was 218,322 tonnes of extractable copper and 2,525 tonnes molybdenum in concentrate from the 72,000 tonnes per day concentrator.

Work is now under way on the Andina Phase I Development Project which aims to raise mill capacity to 92,000 tonnes per day and is expected to be complete by November 2009. Pre feasibility studies on raising mill capacity to over 200,000 tonnes per day by 2014 should be complete this year. Deep drilling to prove up resources to sustain such a production rate continue. No estimates of the likely copper output at a milling rate of 200,000 tonnes per day have been given and cannot be until the deep drilling campaign is complete.

One of the mysteries of Andina is why it did not buy Compania Minera Disputada de las Condes when Peñarroya was prepared to sell it for a very low price in 1972. It went to ENAMI who subsequently sold it for a handsome profit to Exxon Minerals for US$97 million. It would have given Codelco complete control of the district. When Exxon finally did decide to sell in 2002, Codelco expressed interest but were not prepared to match the US$1.3 billion that Anglo American were prepared to give for it.

Rock glaciers have been seriously intervened by Andina since the late 1980s, when it started to deposit several million tons of waste rock on top of rock glaciers, resulting in their acceleration and partial destabilisation. Since then, 2.1 km^{2} of rock glaciers with a water equivalent of more than 15 million cubic metres have been affected by Andina, including the partial removal of rock glaciers.

In November 2024, Codelco applied for an environmental permit for a $650 million project with aims to make water use in its Andlina mine more sustainable. The Andina project in central Chile has faced a decade of drought and will require a maximum of 1,650 workers and take about 36 months to complete.

=== El Teniente ===
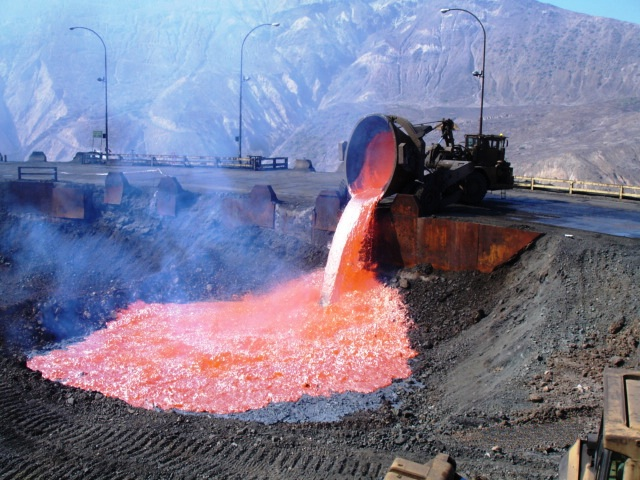
Molten slag is from Caletones carried outside and poured into a dump, 2005. Caletones serves El Teniente mine in the Andes of Central Chile.

Situated 44 km east of Rancagua and 75 km south of the capital, Santiago, El Teniente claims to be the largest underground copper mine in the world (see below). The El Teniente orebody has been known and worked on a small scale for many years. In the 16th century it became the property of the Jesuits as it was located on their Hacienda de la Compañia de Jesús. They operated a small mine known as the Socavón de los Jesuitas. Following their expulsion, the hacienda was acquired in 1768 by Don Mateo de Toro y Zambrano y Ureta. Between 1819 and 1823 his heirs restarted and enlarged the workings, bringing in a mining engineer to help. However, these and subsequent attempts to establish anything more than a small scale mine failed for lack of capital and the property was eventually bought by the American, William Braden, for approximately US$100,000. The same year Braden formed Rancagua Mines, which became the Braden Copper Company, in association with old colleagues from ASARCO, including Barton Sewell.

Work started on establishing a mine in 1905 after Government permission had been acquired but progress was slow because of difficulty of access and a hard winter climate. A small gravity plant was soon erected but it was not until 1912 that a flotation plant was erected at Sewell. Control passed to Kennecott in 1915 and it ran the mine until nationalisation in 1971.

==== The present mine ====
The porphyry orebody consists of a stockwork (a network of narrow veins) of mineralised veinlets, mainly in andesitic lavas and tonalite, superimposed by a leached zone and a substantial zone of secondary enrichment, both of very variable thickness. It surrounds a narrow, almost circular ring of tourmaline breccia which in turn surrounds the Braden Chimney, an inverted cone of breccia which was emplaced after the main mineralisation. Reserves and resources are substantial. At the end of 2007 reserves and resources in the mining plan totalled 4,204 million tonnes grading 0.91% copper or 38.3 million tonnes of contained copper. In addition the mine has identified additional resources of 15,827 million tonnes grading 0.46% copper or nearly 73 million tonnes of contained copper though there is no indication how much of this may prove economic. Production in 2007 was 404,728 tonnes copper and 5,053 tonnes molybdenum.

Mining is gradually moving lower and removing the ore between the barren country rock and the Braden Chimney. Access is through adits (horizontal tunnels) to shafts and other services cut in the Braden Chimney. Mining methods include panel caving, panel caving with pre-undercut, and block caving, which have been adapted to overcome the serious rockburst problem which stopped mining some years ago on level 6 and threatened the future of the mine. A new level, Level 8, is now in operation and another, lower, level is being studied which will give access to 1.5 billion tonnes of ore grading 0.96% copper and extend the life of the mine by many years.

All ore is now treated in the lower Colón mill, the original Sewell mill being closed. Capacity is now 130,000 tonnes daily, split equally between SAG and conventional milling, followed by flotation, thickening and filtration. The recent increase in mill capacity has been necessary to compensate for the gradual move of mining into the lower grade primary ore zone. The concentrate goes to the Caletones smelter further down the valley. This is equipped with two Teniente converters with slag furnaces, three Pierce Smith converters and six anode furnaces feeding two anode and one fire refined casting wheels. Tailings are flumed down the valley to dams on flatter ground. An independent company, Minera Valle Central, retreats old and current El Teniente tailings and extracts some 12,000 tonnes p.a. of copper in concentrate.

==== Sewell ====
Sewell, the original mine camp and known as the 'city of stairs' because it looked as though it had been poured down the mountain, has become a UNESCO World Heritage Site. It was founded in 1906 by William Braden to house his mine workers and had a population of around 15,000 at its peak. It was closed down in the late 1980s as all the workers moved down to Rancagua.

=== Other projects ===
The Gabriela Mistral Project ("Gaby") is an oxide copper project located 120 km south of Calama. Reserves are estimated at 580 million tonnes of oxide ore grading 1.41% copper and there is underlying sulphide mineralisation but this is not being considered at present. A 14-year open pit leaching and SX/EW operation producing about 150,000 tonnes of copper annually is planned. Startup was in 2008 marking the milestone to be the first mine in the world to introduce the full autonomous trucks from [Komatsu]. Leaching of tailings with the potential to produce and additional 30,000 to 50,000 tonnes p.a. between 2011 and 2014 is being investigated, as is wind power. An 'exotic copper' orebody, "Vicky" has also been found in the Gabriela Mistral area with potential estimated resources of 80 million tons of oxide ore with a copper grade of 0.6%. A 44,000 m^{2} central solar heating plant supplies 80% of the 80 GWh annual heat for an electrowinning copper extraction process, despite dust problems.

The Toki Cluster is a group of porphyries that is now included in the Codelco Norte division. In 2004 the resources in the four porphyries found to date was estimated at 18 million tonnes of copper. Since then a fifth, "Miranda", has been found containing estimated resources of 2.5 million tonnes of copper.

In May 2025, it was announced that Codelco was partnering with Rio Tinto to mine lithium for EV batteries at a new Maricunga project in northern Chile. Rio Tinto will invest $900 million and own just under half of the operation.

=== Ventanas ===
Ventanas is a smelter situated on the coast 35 km north of Valparaiso. It was transferred from ENAMI in May 2005. It processes concentrates and anodes from Andina and El Teniente, amongst other producers, and makes Codelco increasingly self-sufficient. The 'New Ventanas Project' is investigating the feasibility of converting it into a large scale smelting and refining complex.

The plant consists of a Teniente converter with electric furnace slag cleaning, three Pierce Smith converters, a rotary anode furnace and two reverbatory refining furnaces and two anode casting wheels. Capacity is 450,000 tonnes p.a. concentrate to produce 110,000 tonnes copper annually. Off gasses go to a Hugo Petersen sulphuric acid plant. The refinery produces cathode copper, and gold, silver and selenium are produced from the anode slime left over from the refining process.

== Joint ventures ==
=== El Abra ===
Codelco sold a 51% interest in its El Abra deposit in 1994 to Cyprus-Amax (now part of Freeport McMoRan Copper and Gold) who then developed it. Production started in 1996. It is a porphyry copper with an extensive capping of leachable oxide and sulphide mineralisation. Production over the next three years is expected to be in the 152,000 to 168,000 tonnes copper p.a. from the 227,000 tonnes p.a.capacity SX/EW plant. It is planned to exploit the underlying sulphides starting in 2010 which should extend the mine life by over 10 years.

=== Inversiones Mineras Becrux ===
Inversiones Mineras Becrux is a joint venture of Codelco and Mitsui where Codelco owns 67.8% of it. This joint venture holds a 29.5% ownership of copper mining company Anglo American Sur which operates the mines of Los Bronces and El Soldado and the copper smelter of Chagres. Los Bronces, formerly known as Disputada de Las Condes, lies next to Codelco's Andina mine and these two mines have joint development plan.

== Codelco outside Chile ==
On July 26, 2012, the Chilean and Ecuadorian government signed an agreement to activate the highly controversial Junin copper mining project, in the Intag area of Northwestern Ecuador. The agreement calls for Codelco, jointly with the Ecuadorian national mining company- ENAMI - to begin exploration activities in the biodiverse Cordillera de Toisan after the second quarter of 2013. The project would be one of the first experience for the Chilean-owned company outside the Chilean deserts where it has most of its mines. It is controversial because Intag is the same area where communities have forced two transnational mining companies to abandon exploration activities due to widespread rejection of mining activities (Mitsubishi subsidiary in 1997 and Canadian Copper Mesa in 2009).
