= Slag =

By-product of smelting ores and used metals

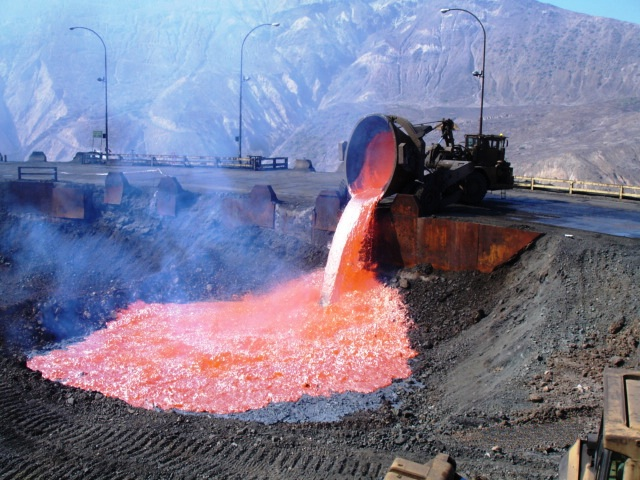
Molten slag is carried outside and poured into a dump. Caletones copper smelter in El Teniente mine, Chile.

Slag is a by-product or co-product of smelting (pyrometallurgical) ores and recycled metals depending on the type of material being produced. Slag is mainly a mixture of metal oxides and silicon dioxide. Broadly, it can be classified as ferrous (co-products of processing iron and steel), ferroalloy (a by-product of ferroalloy production) or non-ferrous/base metals (by-products of recovering non-ferrous materials like copper, nickel, zinc and phosphorus). Within these general categories, slags can be further categorized by their precursor and processing conditions. Examples include blast furnace slags, air-cooled blast furnace slag, granulated blast furnace slag, basic oxygen furnace slag, and electric arc furnace (EAF) slag. Slag generated from the EAF process can contain toxic metals, which can be hazardous to human and environmental health.

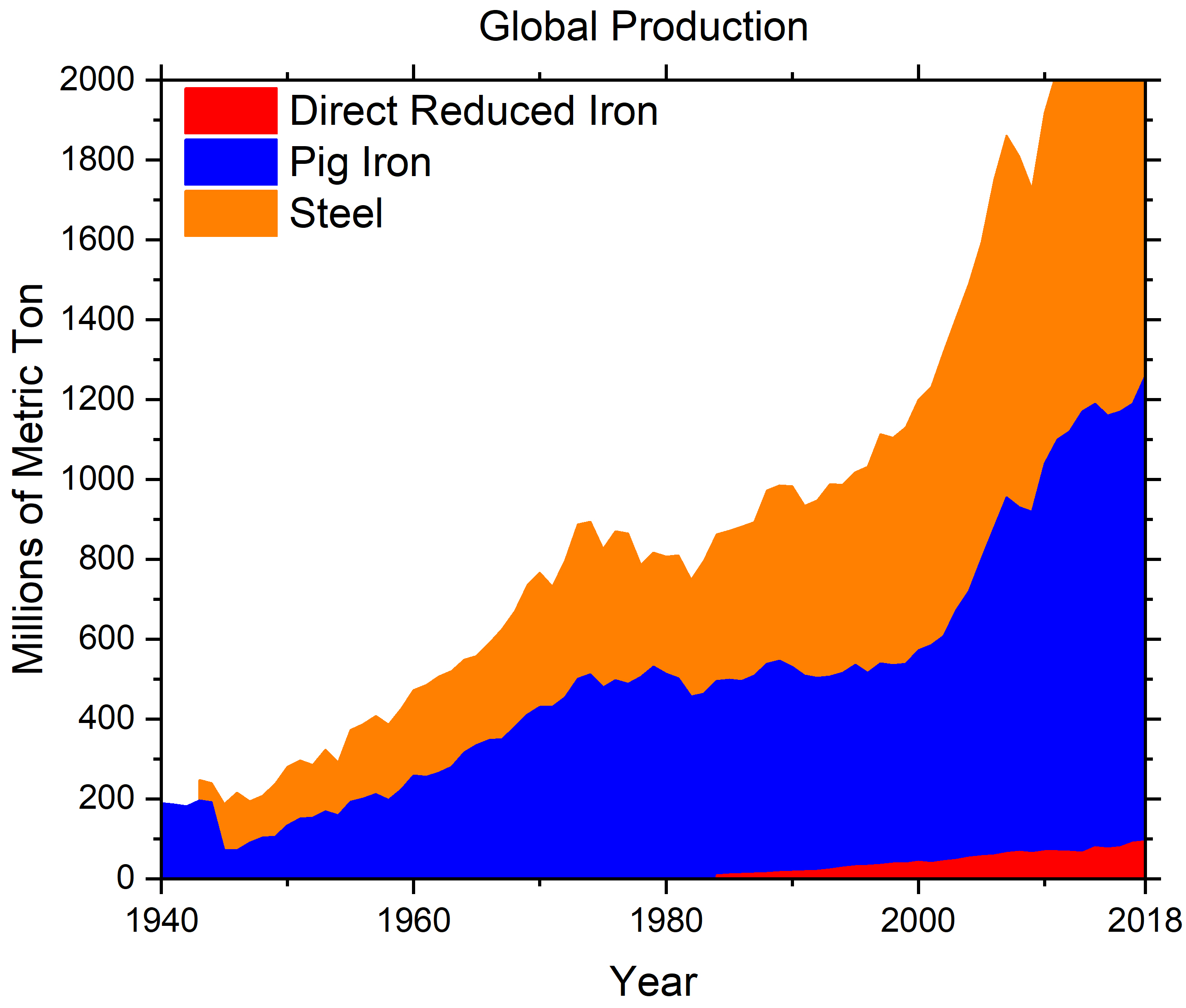
Global production of iron and steel, 1942–2018, according to USGS

Due to the large demand for ferrous, ferralloy, and non-ferrous materials, slag production has increased throughout the years despite recycling (most notably in the iron and steelmaking industries) and upcycling efforts. The World Steel Association (WSA) estimates that 600 kg (1,300 lb) of co-materials (co-products and by-products; about 90 wt% is slags) are generated per tonne of steel produced.

== Composition ==
Slag is usually a mixture of metal oxides and silicon dioxide. However, slags can contain metal sulfides and elemental metals. The oxide form may or may not be present once the molten slag solidifies and forms amorphous and crystalline components.

The major components of these slags include the oxides of calcium, magnesium, silicon, iron, and aluminium, with lesser amounts of manganese, phosphorus, and others depending on the specifics of the raw materials used. Furthermore, slag can be classified based on the abundance of iron among other major components.

== Production ==
Diagram of the principles of traditional steel production processes in the mid-20th century: 1: Blast furnace; 2: Gas cleaner; 3: Cowper stoves; 4: Blowing engine; 5: Mixer; 6: Open-hearth furnace; 7: Bessemer / Thomas converter; 8: Electric arc furnace; A: Limestone (flux); B: Iron ore; C: Coke; D: Hot air blast; E: Slag; F: Pig iron; G: Compressed air; H: Steel; I: Scrap metal

Slag forms during the production of metals in a liquid state. Its low density (2.4) causes it to float above the molten metal (density of steel at 20 °C: 7.85). The metal separates easily from it because slag is an ionic compound, not miscible with the molten metal

=== Blast furnace slag ===
It is a co-product from the production of pig iron in a blast furnace, where it corresponds to the sterile gangue of the iron ore combined with the ashes of the coke. The amount of slag produced directly correlates with the richness of the iron ore used. For a modern blast furnace operating with iron-rich ores, a proportion of 180 to 350 kilograms (400 to 770 lb) of slag per 1 tonne (1.1 tons) of pig iron is typical. Extreme values are possible: 100 kilograms per tonne (220 lb/long ton) for a blast furnace using charcoal, or 1,300 kilograms per tonne (2,900 lb/long ton) for poor ores and cheap fuel.

For the steelmaker, blast furnace slag enables control of the pig iron composition (notably by removing sulfur, an undesirable element, as well as alkalis, which disrupt furnace operation)

Experienced steelmakers can estimate the approximate composition and properties of molten slag. Often, a simple "hook test" suffices, where an iron hook is dipped into the molten slag. If the slag adheres in small droplets to the hook (short slag): it is fluid and basic, with a basicity index i, defined by the weight ratio CaO / SiO_{2} greater than 1. If the slag flows off the hook in long threads (long slag): it is viscous and acidic, with a ratio i = CaO / SiO_{2} < 1.

However, while a basic slag removes acidic sulfur (SO_{2} or H_{2}S depending on the system's redox conditions), alkalis are only removed from the blast furnace with an acidic slag. Thus, the slag composition faces an additional compromise: the dilemma faced by the blast furnace operator is sometimes resolved by accepting a relatively high sulfur content in the pig iron [...], or by replacing, at constant basicity, the lime (CaO) in the slag with magnesia (MgO), a condition more favorable for alkali removal and refractory wear control.

However, from a thermal perspective, slag is a sterile material to melt, even if its enthalpy of fusion, around 1,800 megajoules per tonne (510 kWh/long ton) of slag, accounts for only 3.5% of the blast furnace's energy balance, its value, though non-negligible, is far less significant than that of pig iron. Poor iron ores, like minette ore, which increase coke consumption in the blast furnace, have been abandoned because the amount of material to heat is greater. Indeed, even for a blast furnace using iron-rich ores, the slag volume equals that of the produced pig iron (due to density differences), the sale price of granulated slag contributes less than 5% to the pig iron production cost.

Typical compositions of pig iron slag (in % by weight)
Slag type	FeO / Fe_{2}O_{3}	MnO	SiO_{2}	Al_{2}O_{3}	CaO	MgO	P_{2}O_{5}	TiO_{2}	S
Blast furnace (hematite pig iron)	0.16–0.2	< 1	34–36	10–12	38–41	7–10		1	1–1.5
Cupola furnace (melting furnace).	0.5–2.5	1–2	25–30	5–15	45–55	1–2			

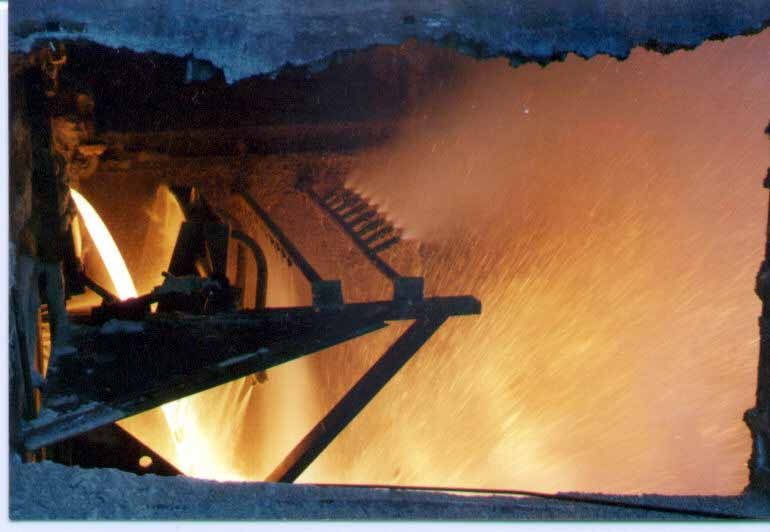
Molten slag flowing into a pelletizing plant

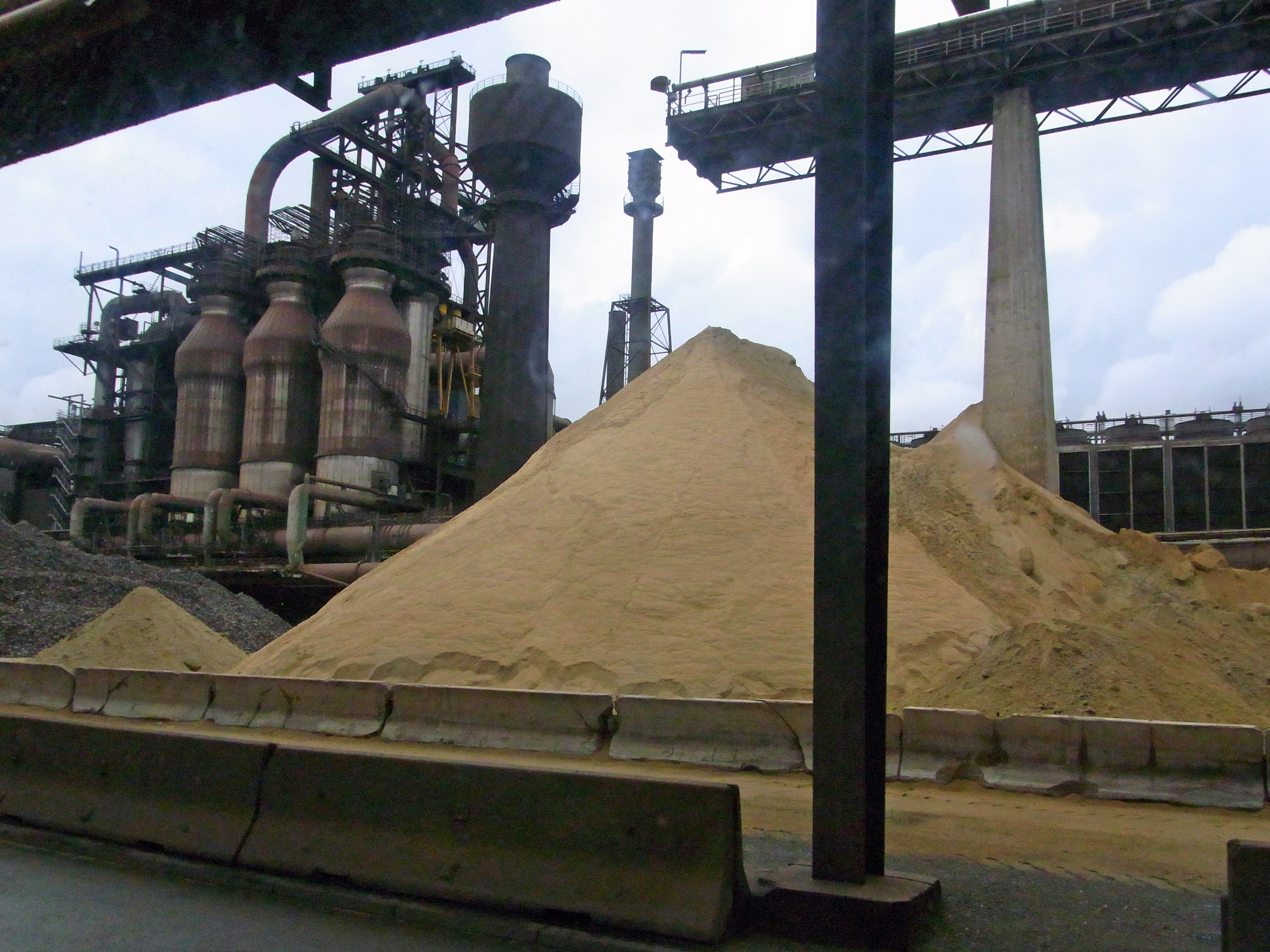
Granulated (or vitrified) blast furnace slag

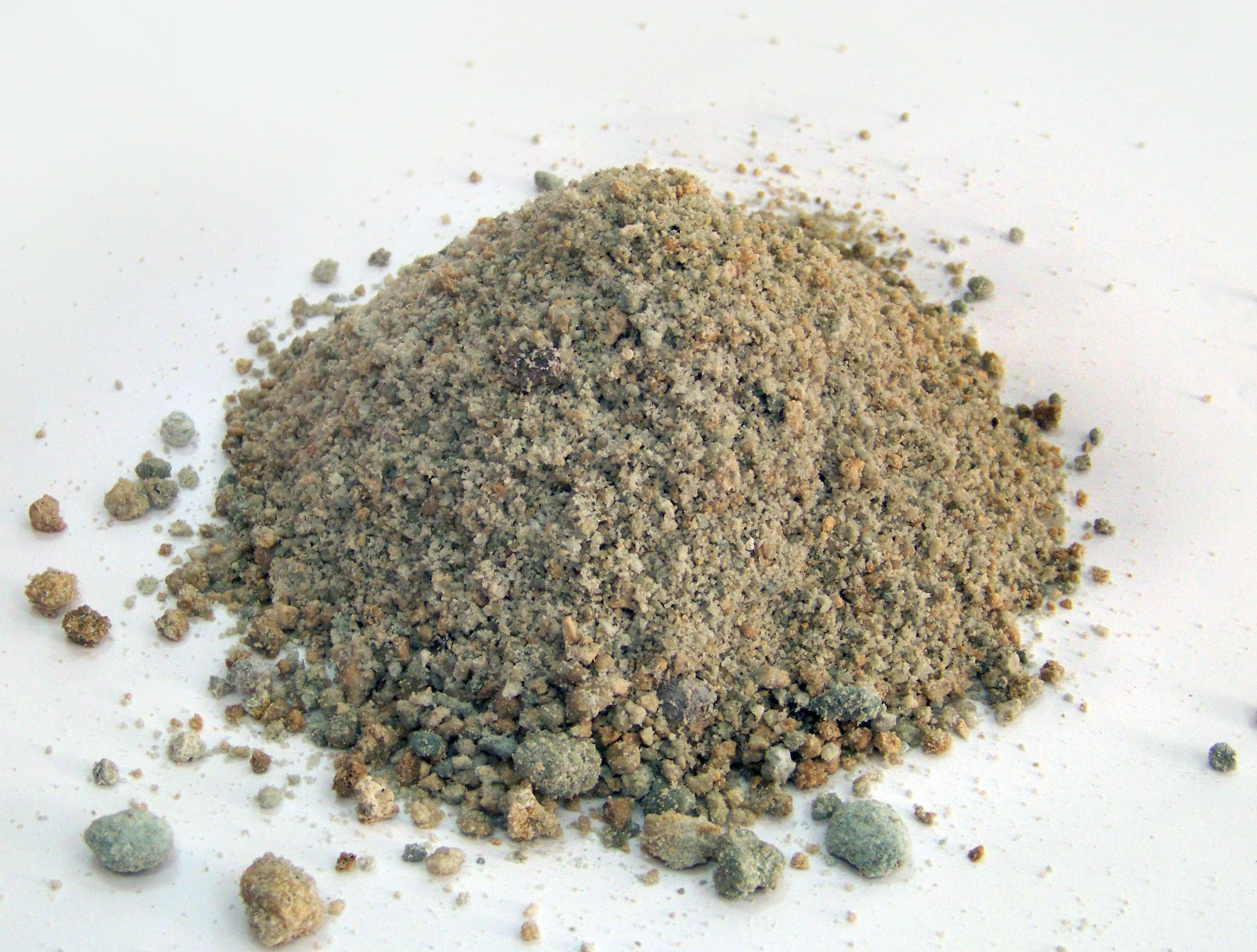
Sample of granulated slag

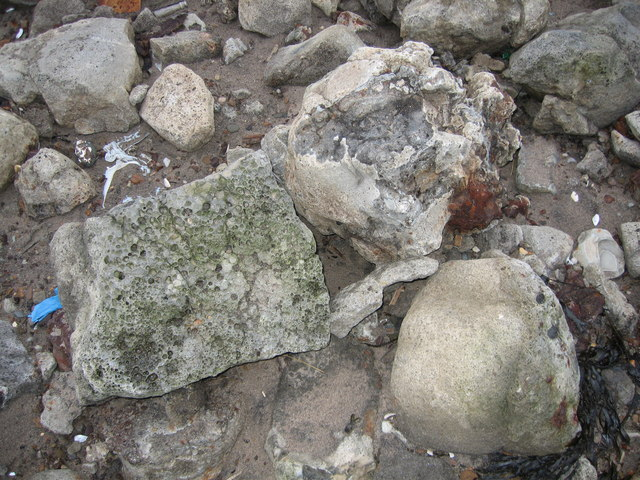
Block of crystallized slag used as fill

=== Steelmaking slag ===
==== Primary metallurgy slag (or black slag) ====
In a steel mill, slag comes from converters, where it is highly oxidized, from ladle metallurgy, or from electric arc furnaces. For one ton of steel produced, approximately 150 to 200 kilograms (330 to 440 lb) of steelmaking slag is generated, regardless of the process (blast furnace–converter or scrap melting).

Converter slag (or black slag) is produced by the oxidation of undesirable elements (such as silicon, sulfur, and phosphorus). However, the oxidation of certain metals (like iron and manganese) is unavoidable due to the process's nature (injection of O_{2} to oxidize carbides in pig iron).

Typical compositions of primary metallurgy slag (in % by weight, at the end of refining)
Slag type	FeO / Fe_{2}O_{3}	MnO	SiO_{2}	Al_{2}O_{3}	CaO	MgO	P_{2}O_{5}	S
Original Bessemer	15	7	75	3			0	
Original Thomas	17	9	15		37	10	12	0.5
Improved Thomas	10	3	7	2	52	5	20	0.3
OLP-type converter	12	4	7		57		20	
LD-type converter	20	7	13		48		2	
Electric arc furnace	32	5	15	5	34	9		
Electric arc furnace with OLP treatment	20–30		7		50		1–2.5	

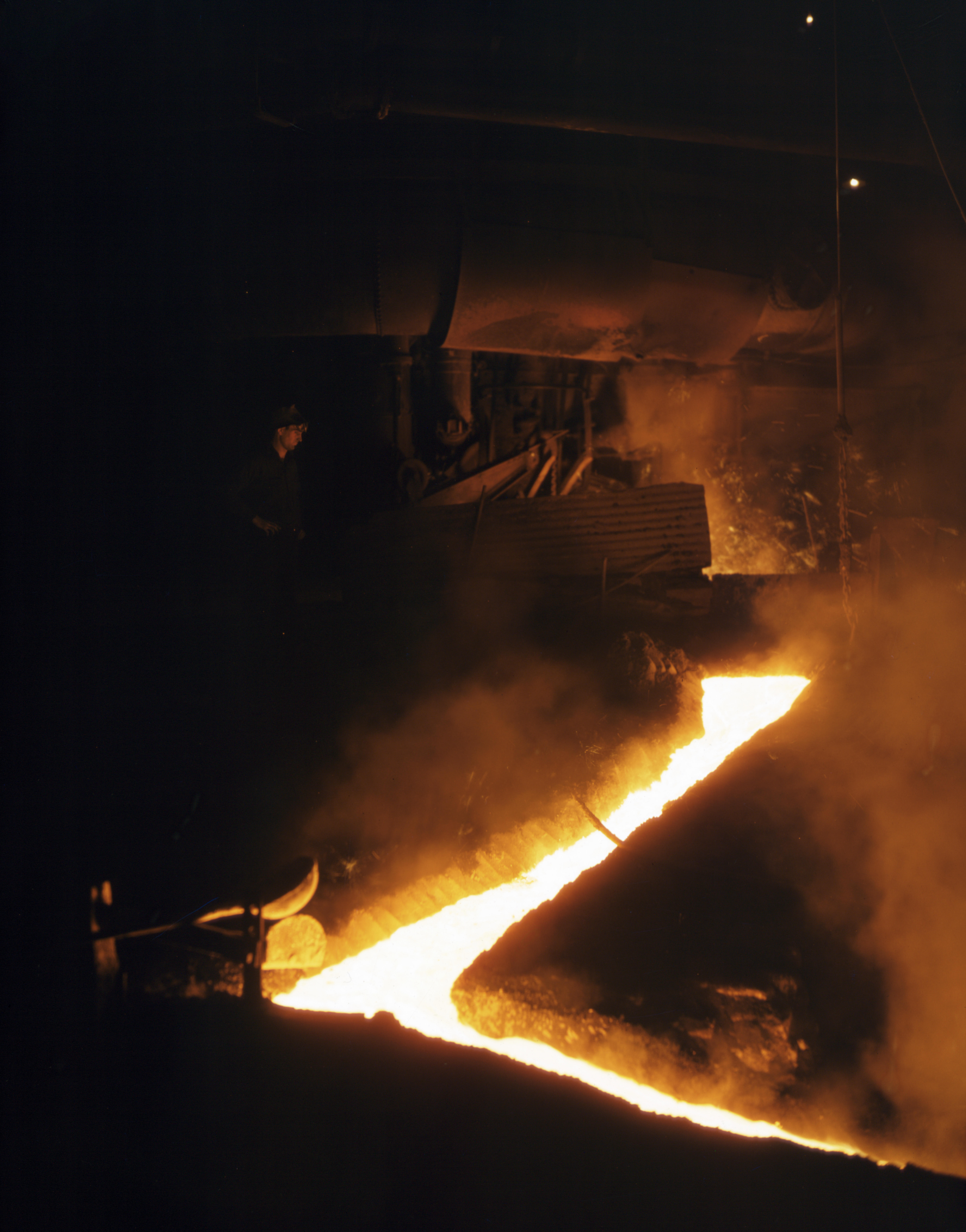
Molten slag flowing into a channel, exiting a Martin-Siemens converter in 1941

Molten slag flowing into a slag pot, collecting overflow from the metal ladle behind, exiting a Martin-Siemens converter

==== Secondary metallurgy slag (or white slag) ====
The role of secondary metallurgy slag (or white slag) is as varied as it is complex. It gathers impurities and undesirable chemical elements by absorbing dissolved oxide inclusions in the metal, typically from deoxidation. For this, managing its composition to make it reactive is essential. For example, a high lime and fluoride content promotes the capture of acidic alumina inclusions. However, this slag must also protect refractory bricks; the adjustment of steelmaking slag is thus a compromise.

Moreover, certain slag oxides, like FeO, can oxidize alloy additions such as ferrotitanium, aluminum, or ferroboron... In this case, these alloying elements are consumed before reaching the liquid metal: their oxidation is thus wasteful. Excessive slag quantities or poorly controlled oxidation of the slag are prohibitive in this case.

In ladle metallurgy or secondary metallurgy, tools for slag treatment typically include a "rake" to "skim" the slag floating on the liquid steel. Hoppers allow the addition of products to form or amend the slag.

Steelmaking slag is generally lime-alumina for carbon steels intended for flat products and lime-silica for carbon steels intended for long products. For stainless steels, their high chromium content makes them unsuitable for use as fill, but their internal recycling within the steel mill is economically viable.

Typical compositions of secondary metallurgy slag (in % by weight, at the end of refining)
Slag type	FeO / Fe_{2}O_{3}	MnO	SiO_{2}	Al_{2}O_{3}	CaO	MgO	P_{2}O_{5}	S
Aluminum-deoxidized steel (desulfurizing slag)	0	0	10	35	45	10		0.1

=== Weld slag ===
The term slag is used for the crust that forms on the weld pool when using a flux (electrode coating, powder or granules). It protects the pool from atmospheric oxygen and thermally insulates it. It also contributes to the chemical composition of the weld pool, adding or removing elements (e.g., removing sulfur).

In shielded metal arc welding, the coating, when melting, creates the slag.

Electrodes are distinguished by their coating: basic (rich in lime), which is difficult to use but ensures excellent mechanical strength, or acidic (rich in silica), which is easier to use.

== Physicochemistry ==
Optical basicity (Λ) of slag oxides
Oxide	Basicity
Na_{2}O	1.15
CaO	1.0
MgO	0.78
CaF_{2}	0.67
TiO_{2}	0.61
Al_{2}O_{3}	0.61
MnO	0.59
Cr_{2}O_{3}	0.55
FeO	0.51
Fe_{2}O_{3}	0.48
SiO_{2}	0.48

When molten, slag is a solution of oxides. The most common are FeO, Fe_{2}O_{3}, SiO_{2}, Al_{2}O_{3}, CaO, and MgO. Some sulfides may also be present, but the presence of lime and alumina reduces their solubility.

The molecular geometry of molten slag can be categorized into three oxide groups: acidic, basic, and neutral. The most common acidic oxides are silica and alumina. (Note: Other rarely dominant acidic oxides include Cr_{2}O_{3} and ZrO_{2}. Rarer acidic oxides are As_{2}O_{3}, Bi_{2}O_{3}, and Sb_{2}O_{3}. Among basic oxides, besides lime (CaO) and magnesia (MgO), are FeO, Fe_{2}O_{3}, PbO, Cu_{2}O, Na_{2}O, K_{2}O, and CaF_{2}, the last three often considered fluxes.) When molten, these oxides polymerize, forming long complexes. Acidic slags are thus highly viscous (Note: Acidic slags are viscous, much like volcanic lavas that are felsic, acidic, and silica-rich (causing Plinian or Peléan volcanic eruptions and highly destructive pyroclastic explosions from sudden gas release followed by the fallout of devastating pyroclastic surges).) and do not readily assimilate acidic oxides present in the molten metal.

Basic oxides, such as lime (CaO) or magnesia (MgO), dissolve in an acidic slag as ionic compounds. They break the molecular chains of acidic oxides into smaller units, making the slag less viscous and facilitating the assimilation of other acidic oxides. Up to a certain limit, adding basic oxides to an acidic slag or acidic oxides to a basic slag lowers the melting point.

Neutral oxides (slightly acidic), such as wustite (FeO) or Cu_{2}O, react minimally with oxide chains.

In general, electrical conductivity varies greatly with temperature, and increases with basicity (i.e., with slag fluidity, promoting ion diffusion in the molten medium) and the content of copper and iron oxides. Surface tension, however, depends little on temperature and increases with acidity, i.e., with slag viscosity.

== Ore smelting ==
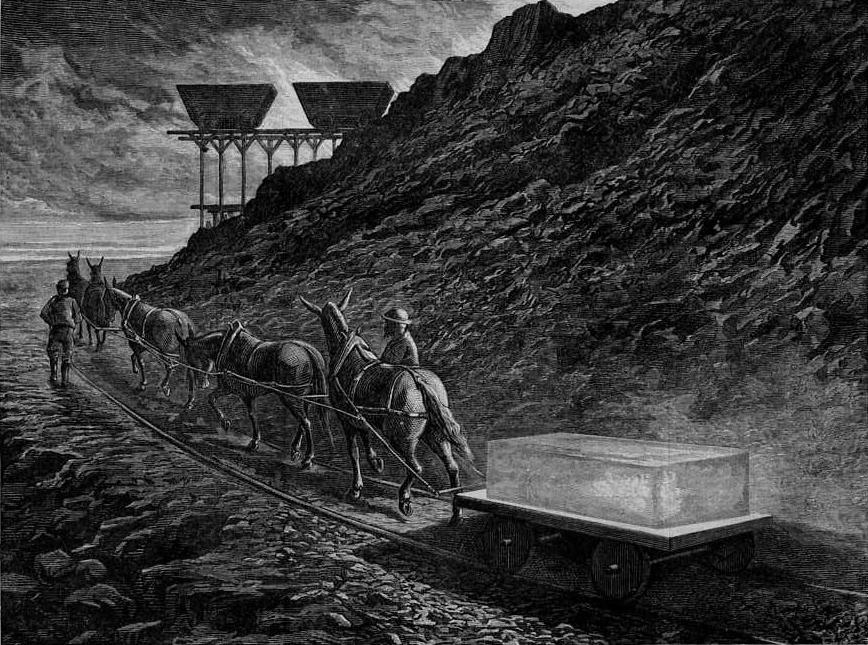
The Manufacture of Iron – Carting Away the Scoriæ (slag), an 1873 wood engraving

In nature, iron, copper, lead, nickel, and other metals are found in impure states called ores, often oxidized and mixed in with silicates of other metals. During smelting, when the ore is exposed to high temperatures, these impurities are separated from the molten metal and can be removed. Slag is the collection of compounds that are removed. In many smelting processes, oxides are introduced to control the slag chemistry, assisting in the removal of impurities and protecting the furnace refractory lining from excessive wear. In this case, the slag is termed synthetic. A good example is steelmaking slag: quicklime (CaO) and magnesite (MgCO_{3}) are introduced for refractory protection, neutralizing the alumina and silica separated from the metal, and assisting in the removal of sulfur and phosphorus from the steel.

As a co-product of steelmaking, slag is typically produced either through the blast furnace – oxygen converter route or the electric arc furnace – ladle furnace route. To flux the silica produced during steelmaking, limestone and/or dolomite are added, as well as other types of slag conditioners such as calcium aluminate or fluorspar.

== Classifications ==
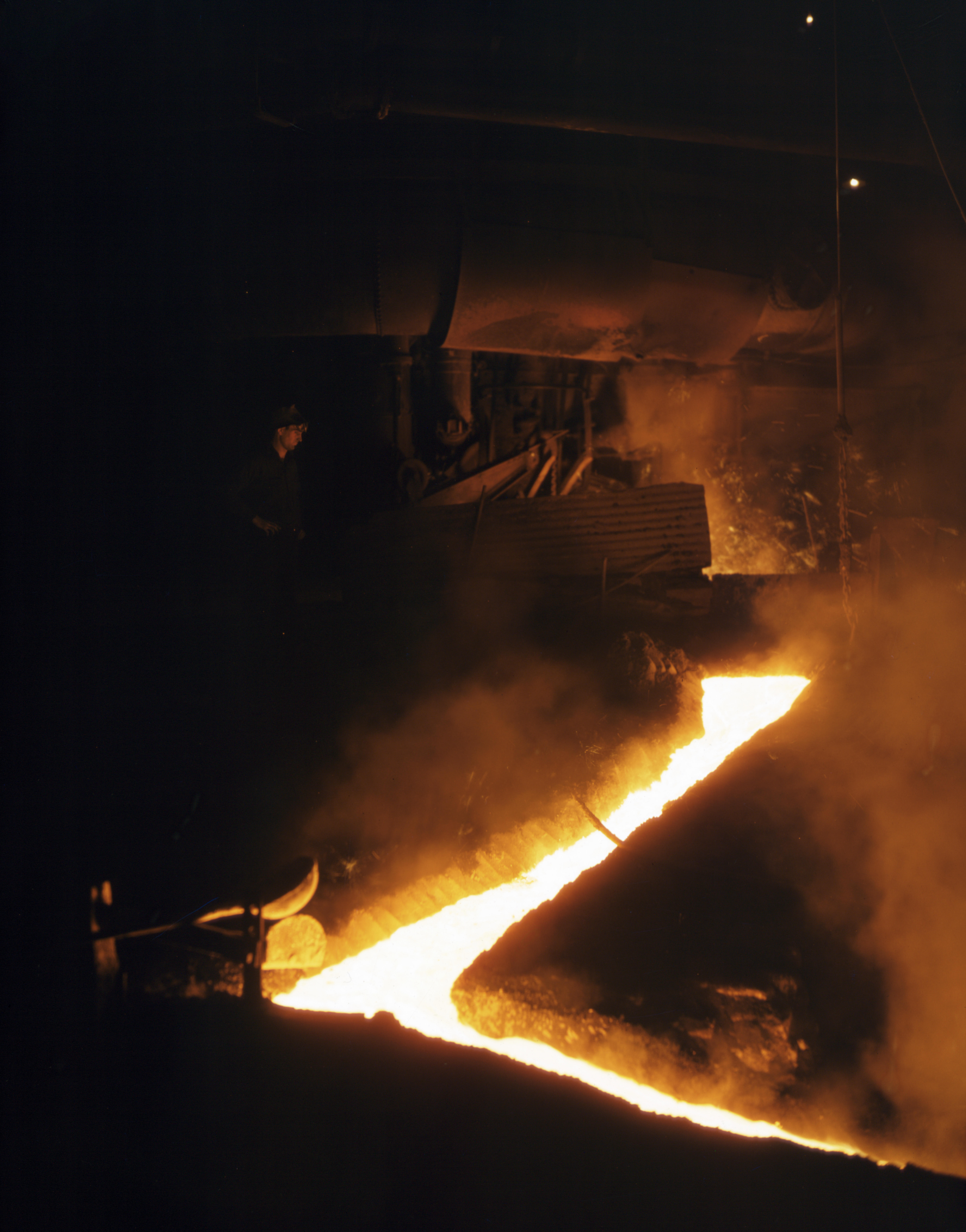
Slag run-off from one of the open hearth furnaces of a steel mill, Republic Steel, Youngstown, Ohio, November 1941. Slag is drawn off the furnace just before the molten steel is poured into ladles for ingotting.

There are three types of slag: ferrous, ferroalloy, non-ferrous slags, which are produced through different smelting processes.

=== Ferrous slag ===
Ferrous slags are produced in different stages of the iron and steelmaking processes resulting in varying physiochemical properties. Additionally, the rate of cooling of the slag material affects its degree of crystallinity further diversifying its range of properties. For example, slow cooled blast furnace slags (or air-cooled slags) tend to have more crystalline phases than quenched blast furnace slags (ground granulated blast furnace slags) making it denser and better suited as an aggregate. It may also have higher free calcium oxide and magnesium oxide content, which are often converted to its hydrated forms if excessive volume expansions are not desired. On the other hand, water quenched blast furnace slags have greater amorphous phases giving it latent hydraulic properties (as discovered by Emil Langen in 1862) similar to Portland cement.

During the process of smelting iron, ferrous slag is created, but dominated by calcium and silicon compositions. Through this process, ferrous slag can be broken down into blast furnace slag (produced from iron oxides of molten iron), then steel slag (forms when steel scrap and molten iron combined). The major phases of ferrous slag contain calcium-rich olivine-group silicates and melilite-group silicates.

Slag from steel mills in ferrous smelting is designed to minimize iron loss, which gives out the significant amount of iron, following by oxides of calcium, silicon, magnesium, and aluminium. As the slag is cooled down by water, several chemical reactions from a temperature of around 2,600 °F (1,430 °C) (such as oxidization) take place within the slag.

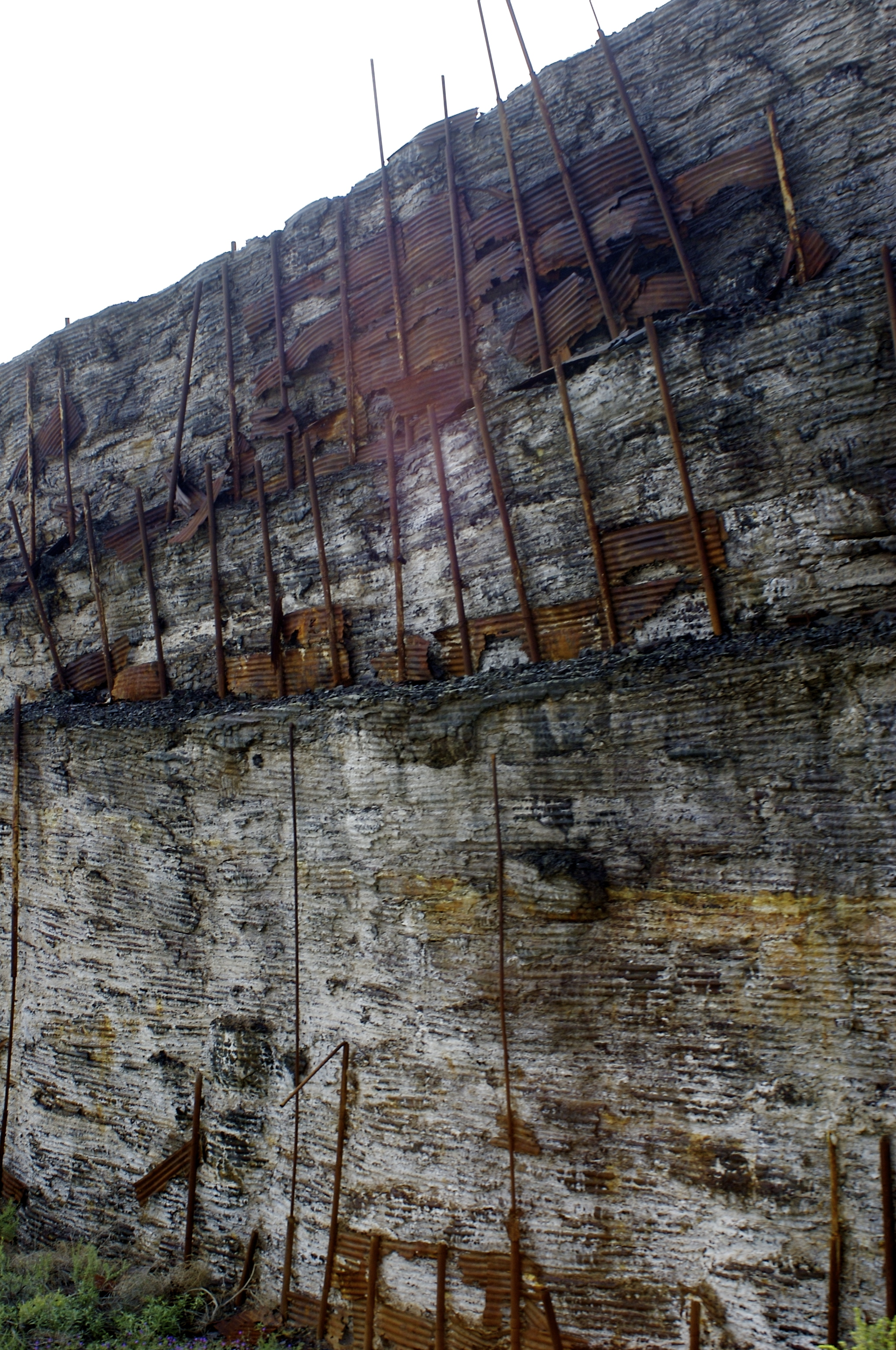
A path through a slag heap in Clarkdale, Arizona, showing the striations from the rusting corrugated sheets retaining it

Based on a case study at the Hopewell National Historical Site in Berks and Chester counties, Pennsylvania, US, ferrous slag usually contains lower concentration of various types of trace elements than non-ferrous slag. However, some of them, such as arsenic (As), iron, and manganese, can accumulate in groundwater and surface water to levels that can exceed environmental guidelines.

=== Non-ferrous slag ===
Non-ferrous slag is produced from non-ferrous metals of natural ores. Non-ferrous slag can be characterized into copper, lead, and zinc slags due to the ores' compositions, and they have more potential to impact the environment negatively than ferrous slag. The smelting of copper, lead and bauxite in non-ferrous smelting, for instance, is designed to remove the iron and silica that often occurs with those ores, and separates them as iron-silicate-based slags.

Copper slag, the waste product of smelting copper ores, was studied in an abandoned Penn Mine in California, US. For six to eight months per year, this region is flooded and becomes a reservoir for drinking water and irrigation. Samples collected from the reservoir showed the higher concentration of cadmium (Cd) and lead (Pb) that exceeded regulatory guidelines.

== Applications ==
Slags can serve other purposes, such as assisting in the temperature control of the smelting, and minimizing any re-oxidation of the final liquid metal product before the molten metal is removed from the furnace and used to make solid metal. In some smelting processes, such as ilmenite smelting to produce titanium dioxide, the slag can be the valuable product.

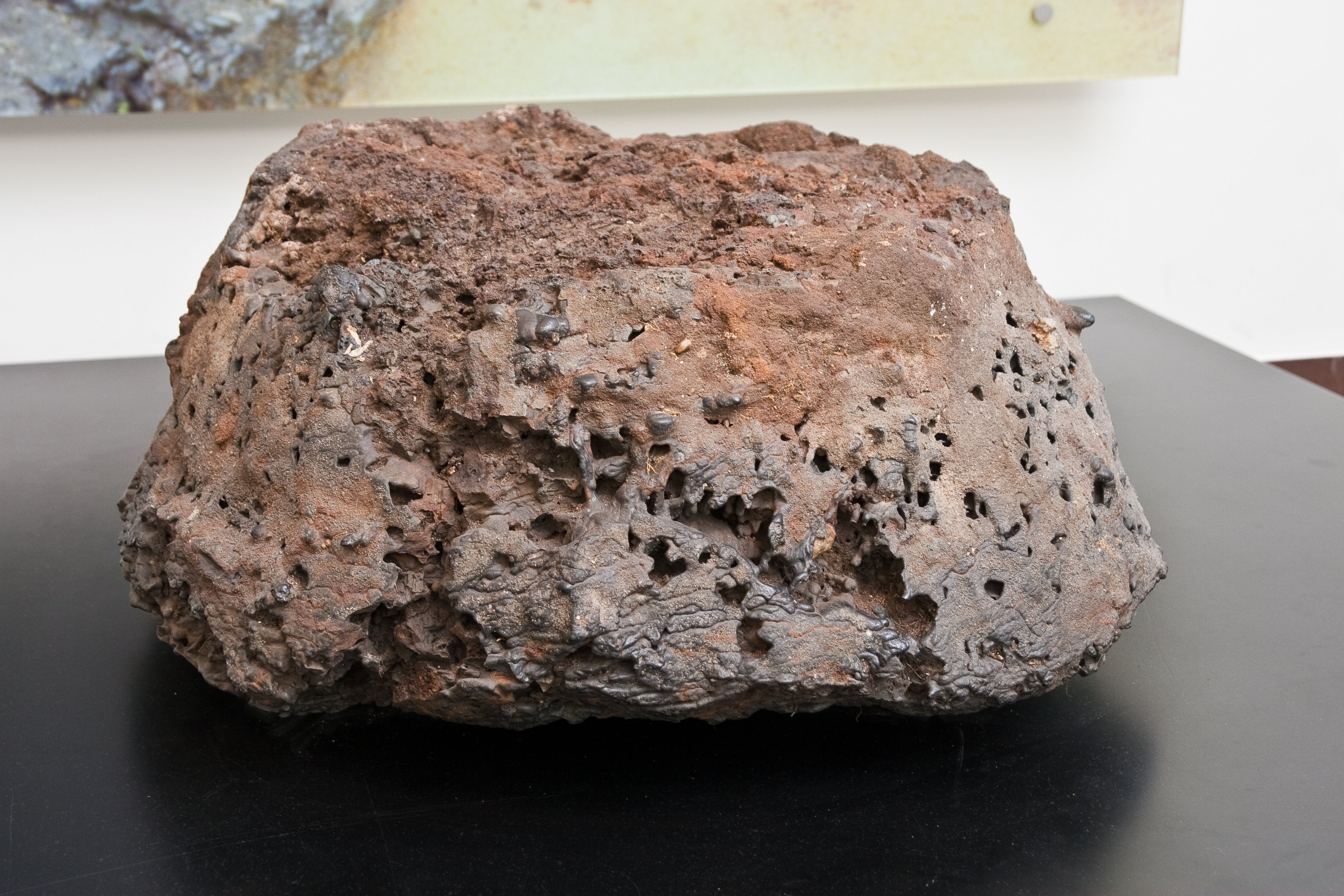
Early slag from Denmark, c. 200–500 CE

=== Ancient uses ===
During the Bronze Age of the Mediterranean area there were a vast number of differential metallurgical processes in use. A slag by-product of such workings was a colorful, glassy material found on the surfaces of slag from ancient copper foundries. It was primarily blue or green and was formerly chipped away and melted down to make glassware products and jewelry. It was also ground into powder to add to glazes for use in ceramics. Some of the earliest such uses for the by-products of slag have been found in ancient Egypt.

Historically, the re-smelting of iron ore slag was common practice, as improved smelting techniques permitted greater iron yields—in some cases exceeding that which was originally achieved. During the early 20th century, iron ore slag was also ground to a powder and used to make agate glass, also known as slag glass.

=== Modern uses ===
==== Construction ====
Use of slags in the construction industry dates back to the 1800s, when blast furnace slags were used to build roads and railroad ballast. During this time, it was also used as an aggregate and had begun being integrated into the cement industry as a geopolymer.

Today, ground granulated blast furnace slags are used in combination with Portland cement to create "slag cement". Granulated blast furnace slags react with portlandite (Ca(OH)_{2}), which is formed during cement hydration, via the pozzolanic reaction to produce cementitious properties that primarily contribute to the later strength gain of concrete. This leads to concrete with reduced permeability and better durability. Careful consideration of the slag type used is required, as the high calcium oxide and magnesium oxide content can lead to excessive volume expansion and cracking in concrete.

These hydraulic properties have also been used for soil stabilization in roads and railroad constructions.

Granulated blast furnace slag is used in the manufacture of high-performance concretes, especially those used in the construction of bridges and coastal features, where its low permeability and greater resistance to chlorides and sulfates can help to reduce corrosive action and deterioration of the structure.

Slag can also be used to create fibers used as an insulation material called slag wool.

Slag is also used as aggregate in asphalt concrete for paving roads. A 2022 study in Finland found that road surfaces containing ferrochrome slag release a highly abrasive dust that has caused car parts to wear at significantly greater than normal rates.

==== Wastewater treatment and agriculture ====
Dissolution of slags generate alkalinity that can be used to precipitate out metals, sulfates, and excess nutrients (nitrogen and phosphorus) in wastewater treatment. Similarly, ferrous slags have been used as soil conditioners to re-balance soil pH and fertilizers as sources of calcium and magnesium.

Because of the slowly released phosphate content in phosphorus-containing slag, and because of its liming effect, it is valued as fertilizer in gardens and farms in steel making areas. However, the most important application is construction.

==== Emerging applications ====
Slags have one of the highest carbonation potential among the industrial alkaline waste due their high calcium oxide and magnesium oxide content, inspiring further studies to test its feasibility in CO_{2} capture and storage (CCS) methods (e.g., direct aqueous sequestration, dry gas-solid carbonation among others). Across these CCS methods, slags can be transformed into precipitated calcium carbonates to be used in the plastic, and concrete industries and leached for metals to be used in the electronic industries.

However, high physical and chemical variability across different types of slags results in performance and yield inconsistencies. Moreover, stoichiometric-based calculation of the carbonation potential can lead to overestimation that can further obfuscate the material's true potential. To this end, some have proposed performing a series of experiments testing the reactivity of a specific slag material (i.e., dissolution) or using the topological constraint theory (TCT) to account for its complex chemical network.

== Health and environmental effect ==
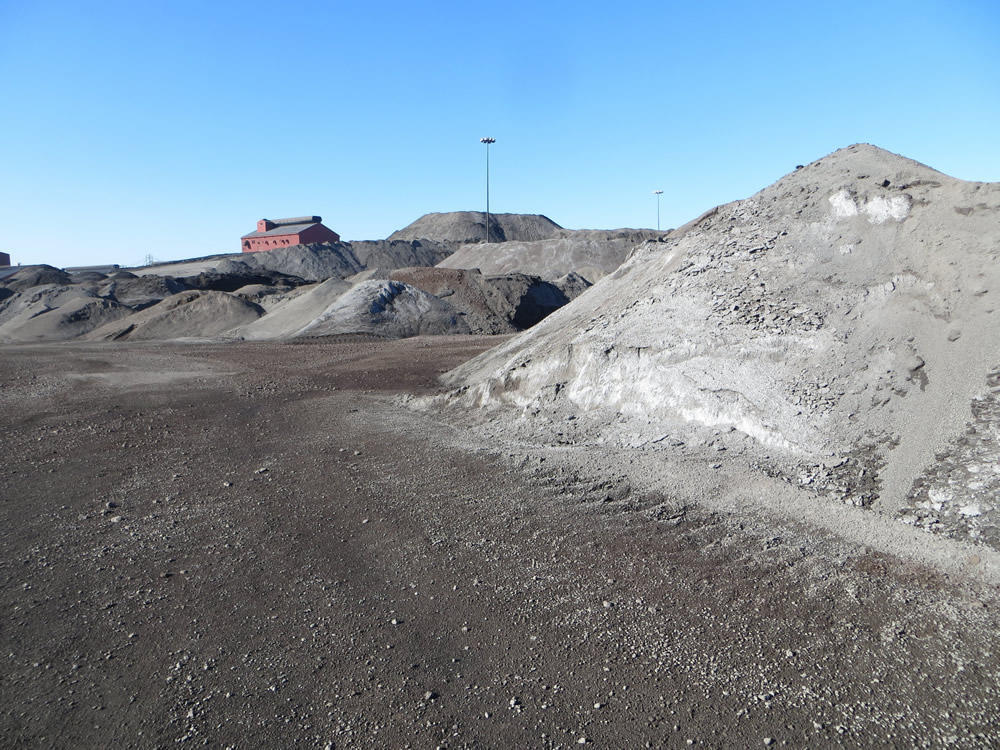
Pile of steelmaking slag at the Cleveland-Cliffs Indiana Harbor steelmaking facility

Slags are transported along with slag tailings to "slag dumps", where they are exposed to weathering, with the possibility of leaching of toxic elements and hyperalkaline runoffs into the soil and water, endangering the local ecological communities. Leaching concerns are typically around non-ferrous or base metal slags, which tend to have higher concentrations of toxic elements. However, ferrous and ferroalloy slags may also have them, which raises concerns about highly weathered slag dumps and upcycled materials.

Dissolution of slags can produce highly alkaline groundwater with pH values above 12. The calcium silicates (CaSiO_{4}) in slags react with water to produce calcium hydroxide ions that leads to a higher concentration of hydroxide (OH-) in ground water. This alkalinity promotes the mineralization of dissolved CO_{2} (from the atmosphere) to produce calcite (CaCO_{3}), which can accumulate to as thick as 20 cm. This can also lead to the dissolution of other metals in slag, such as iron (Fe), manganese (Mn), nickel (Ni), and molybdenum (Mo), which become insoluble in water and mobile as particulate matter. The most effective method to detoxify alkaline ground water discharge is air sparging.

Fine slags and slag dusts generated from milling slags to be recycled into the smelting process or upcycled in a different industry (e.g. construction) can be carried by the wind, affecting a larger ecosystem. It can be ingested and inhaled, posing a direct health risk to the communities near the plants, mines, disposal sites, etc. Elements found in slag such as aluminium, chromium, copper, iron, magnesium, lead and zinc have been found in higher-than-normal amounts, exceeding the United States EPA's generic soil screening levels for human contact. Non-ferrous slag has been seen to have a higher potential to negatively impact the environment due to leaching as opposed to ferrous slag.

== See also ==
- Calcium cycle
- Circular economy
- Clinker (waste)
- Dross
- Fly ash
- Ground granulated blast furnace slag
- Heavy metals
- Mill scale
- Pozzolan
- Slag (welding)
- Spoil tip
- Tailings
