= Converting (metallurgy) =

Type of metallurgical smelting

Converting is a type of metallurgical smelting that includes several processes; the most commercially important form is the treatment of molten metal sulfides to produce crude metal and slag, as in the case of copper and nickel converting. A now-uncommon form is batch treatment of pig iron to produce steel by the Bessemer process. The vessel used was called the Bessemer converter. Modern steel mills use basic oxygen process converters.

== Equipment ==
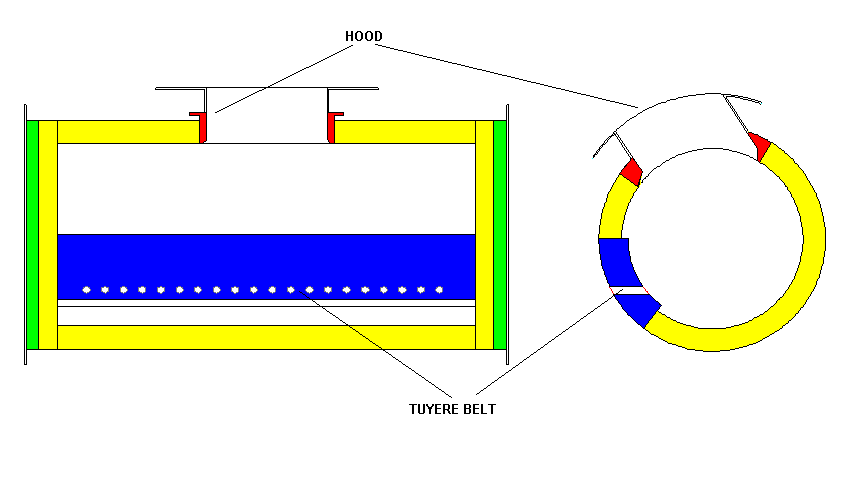
Sketch of a Peirce-Smith converter

The converting process occurs in a converter. Two kinds of converters are widely used: horizontal and vertical.

Horizontal converters of the Peirce-Smith type (which are an improvement of the Manhès-David converter) prevail in the metallurgy of non-ferrous metals. Such a converter is a horizontal barrel lined with refractory material inside. A hood for the purpose of the loading/unloading operations is located on the upper side of the converter. Two belts of tuyeres come along the axis on either sides of the converter.

Molten sulfide material, referred to as matte, is poured through the hood into the converter during the operation of loading. Air is distributed to tuyeres from the two tuyere collectors which are located on opposite sides of the converter. Collector pipes vary in diameter with distance from the connection to air supplying trunk; this is to provide equal pressure of air in each tuyere.

This high temperature roasting allows oxygen in the air to replace sulfide compounds in the minerals. Unless carefully captured, these oxidized sulfur compounds such as sulfur trioxide leave the converter as a noxious acidic vapor, along with other dangerous volatile elements such as arsenic trioxide.

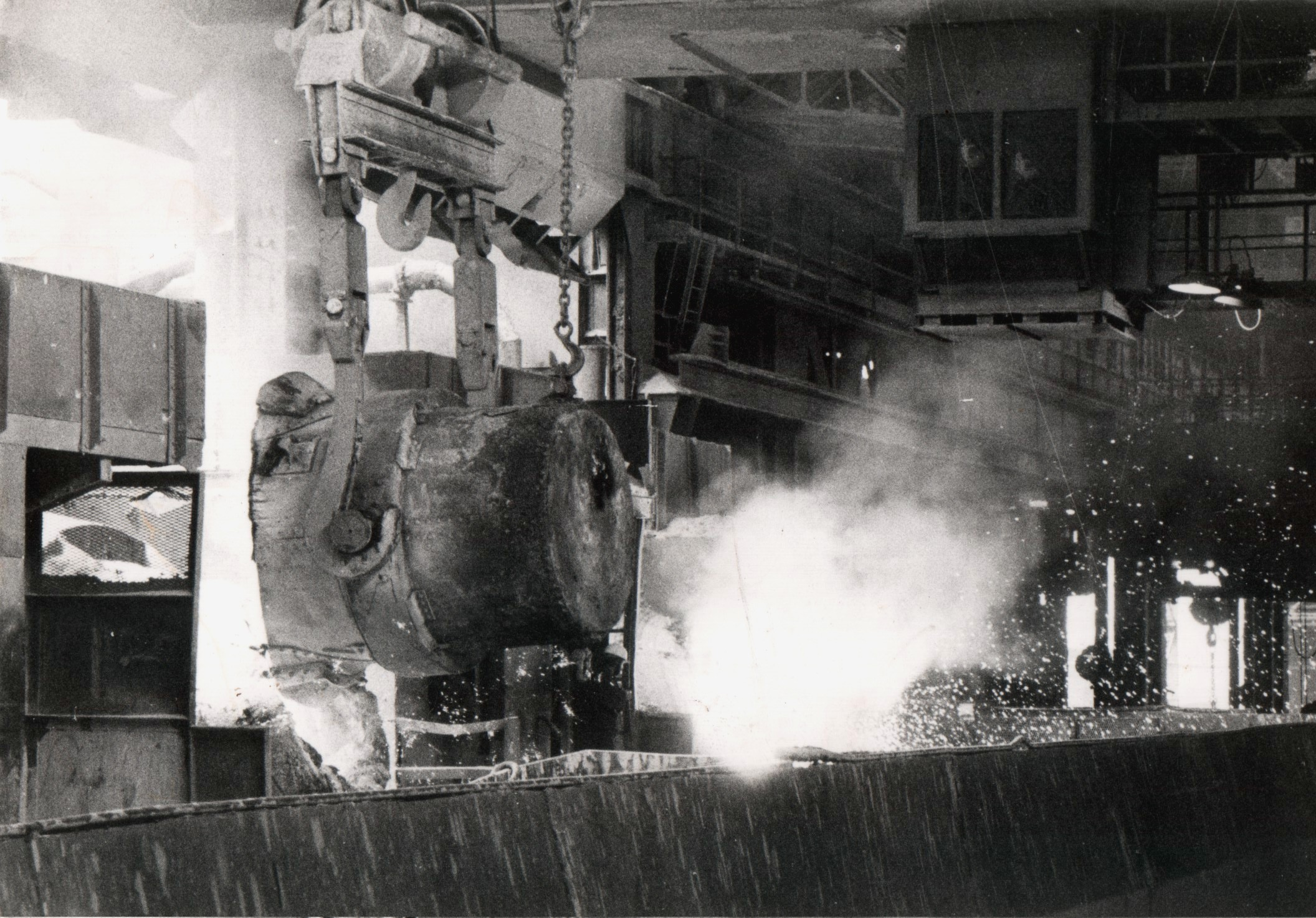

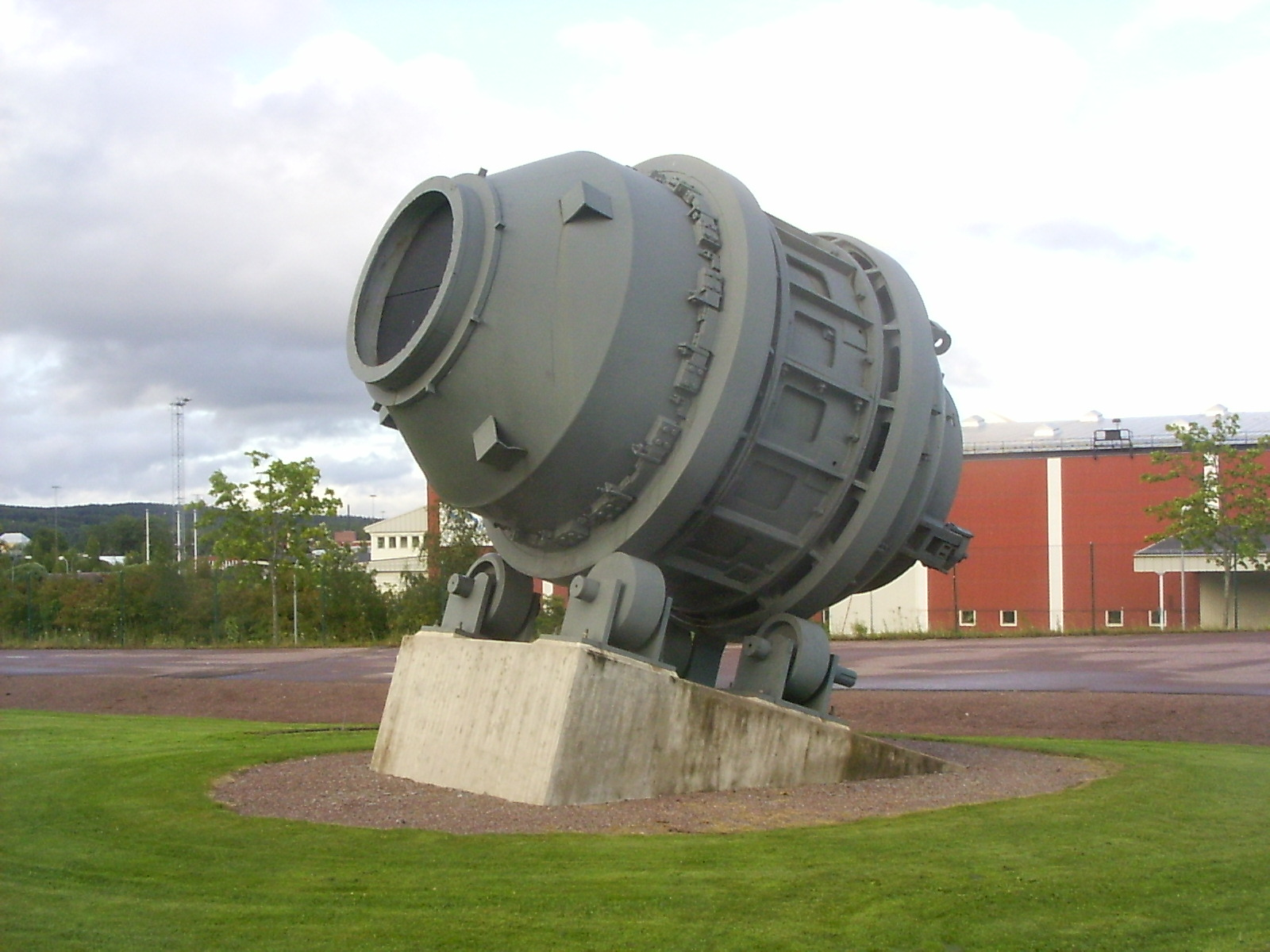

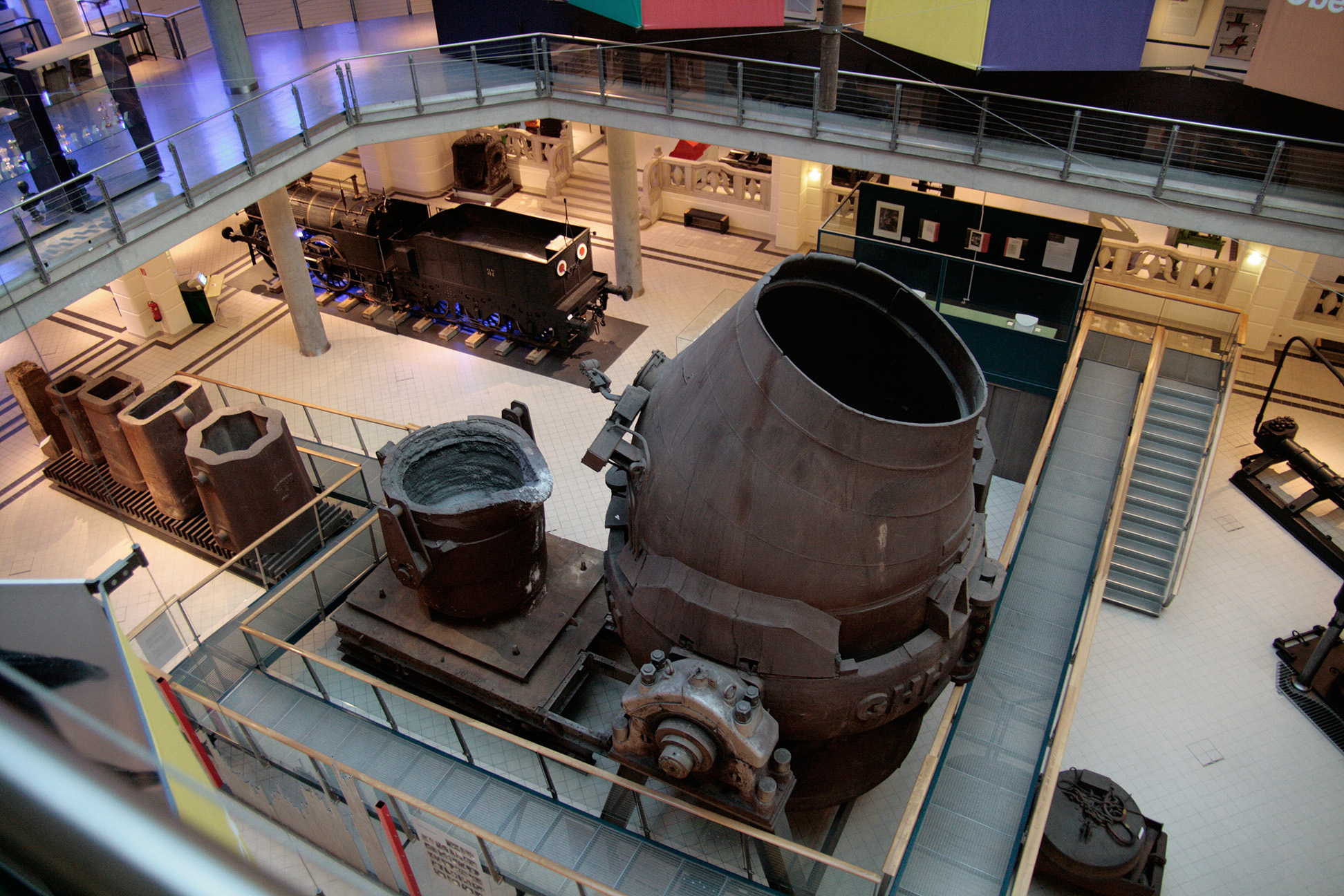

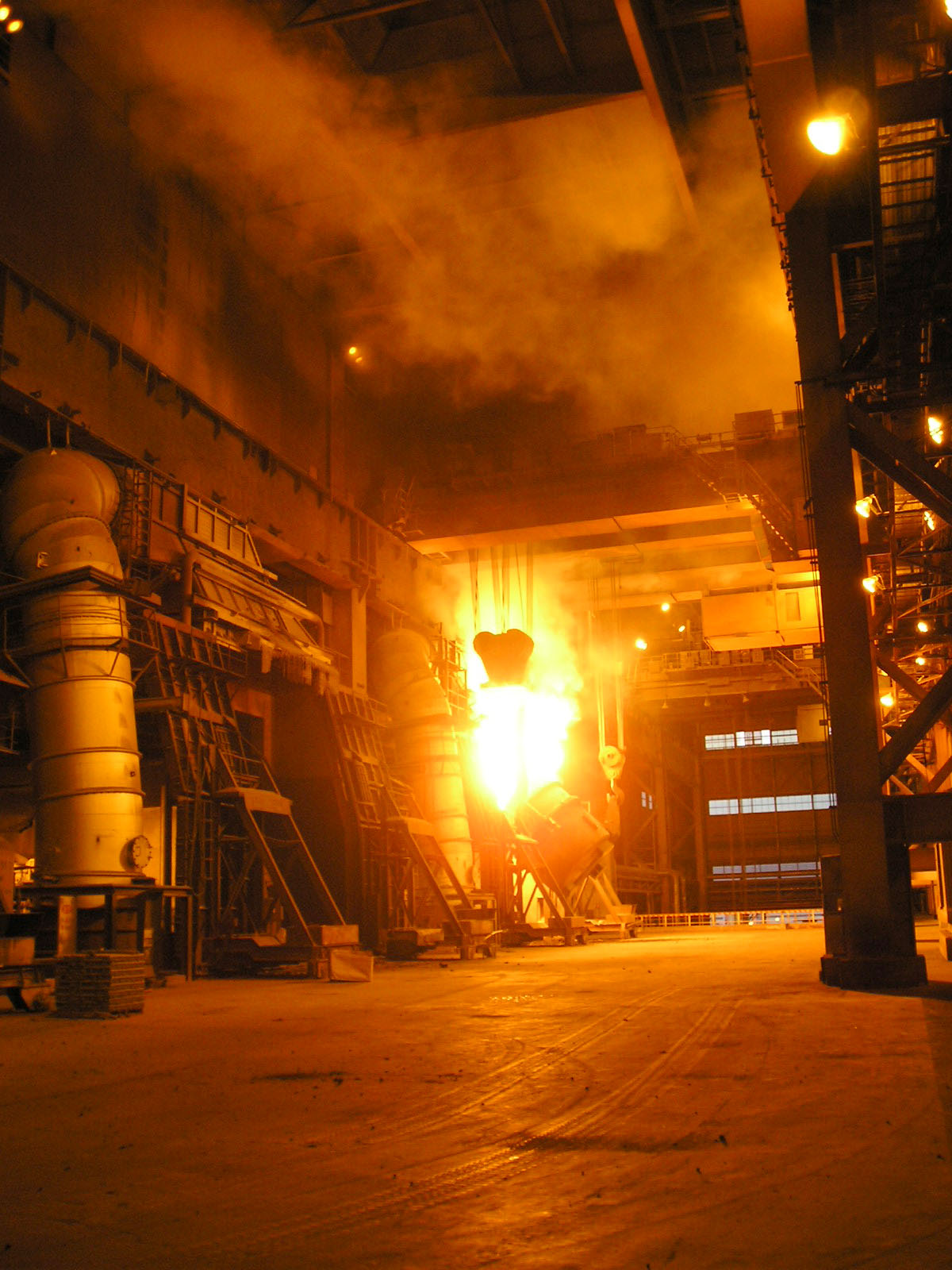

== See also ==
- Smelting
