= List of mining accidents in Chile =

This is an incomplete list of mining accidents in Chile that are known to have resulted in the entrapment or death of persons. Illegal mining is greatly overrepresented relative to legal mining in deadly accidents in Chile.

== 20th century ==
- June 19, 1945: 1945 El Teniente mining accident, in O'Higgins Region. 355 men died in the underground copper mine of El Teniente, largely because of a nearby fire whose smoke trapped the workers in tunnels and resulted in carbon monoxide poisoning. Another 747 men were injured by the smoke.
- February 19, 1964: 1964 Andacollo mining accident, in Coquimbo Region. Seven pirquineros were trapped as result of a cave-in at a gallery of an improvised small-scale gold mine, located in the vicinity of the town of Andacollo.
- March 28, 1965: El Cobre dam failure in Valparaíso Region. As result of the 1965 La Ligua earthquake about 60 to 70 farmhouses and cottages were swept away by the cascading debris flow that emerged from the rupture of one of El Soldado mine's tailings dam. The official death toll is 247, but is thought to be as high as 350–400.

== 21st century ==
List of mining accidents in Chile involving deaths or entrapment since 2000
Date	Deaths (trapped)	Mine/mining district	Cause of death	Illegal mining	Commune	Reference
January 20, 2006	2 (70)	San José	Rockfall	No	Copiapó	
August 5, 2010	0 (33)	San José		No	Copiapó	
January 10, 2011	2	El Indio mine/El Indio Gold Belt	Rockfall	Yes	Vicuña	
September 4, 2020	1	Cavilolen	Rockfall	Yes	Illapel	
September 19, 2020	2	Tambo de Oro	Rockfall	No	Punitaqui	
June 24, 2021	2	Panulcillo	Rainfall-induced collapse	No	Ovalle	
December 18, 2024	2	La Fe	Carbon monoxide poisoning	Yes	Hijuelas	
February 28, 2025	3	Jesús María mine	Rockfall	Yes	Copiapó	
July 31, 2025	6	El Teniente	Rockburst-induced collapse	No	Machalí	
