= Chuquicamata =

Largest open pit mine in the world by volume

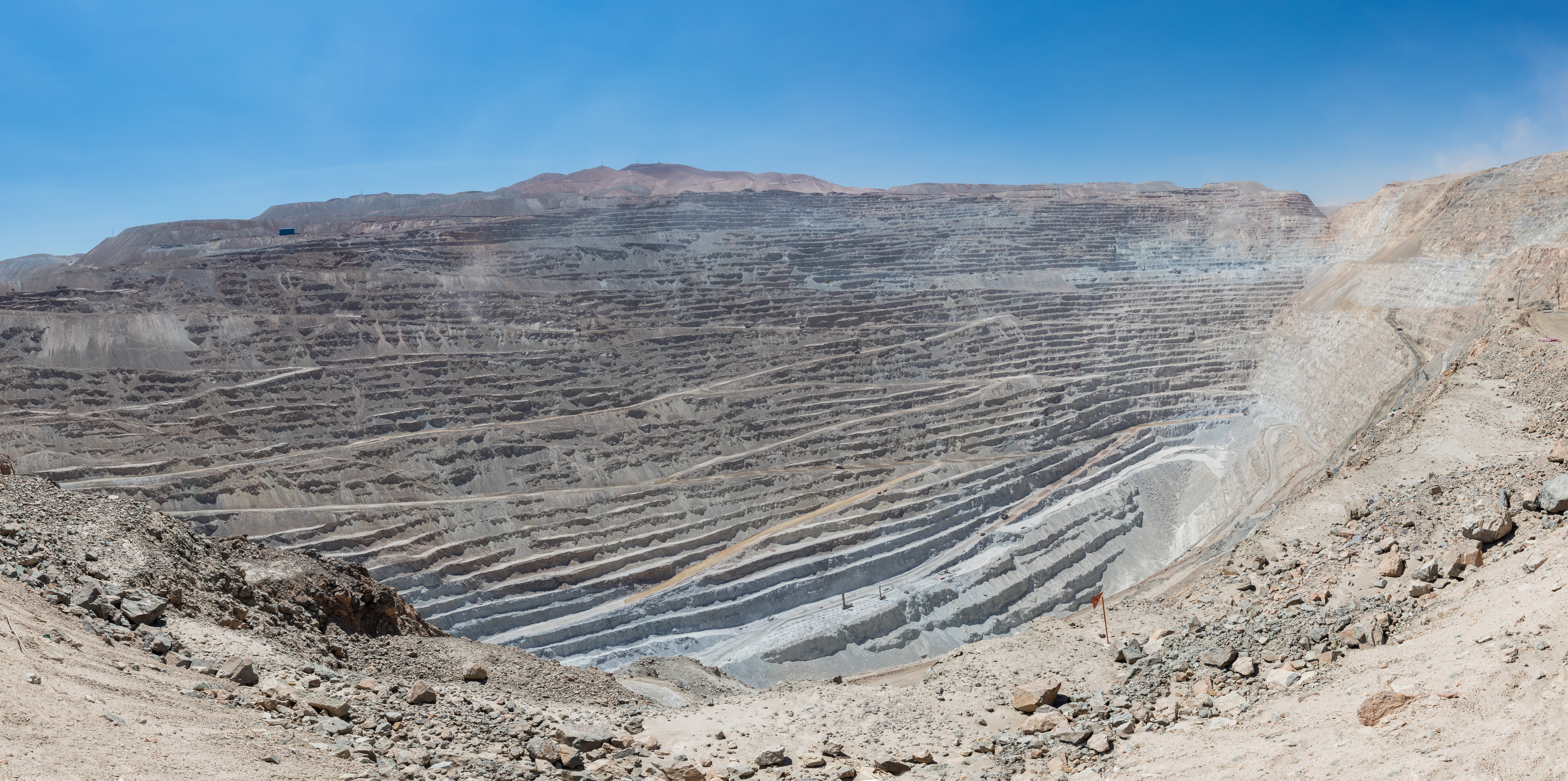
- The pit viewed from entrance

- Location in Chile Chuquicamata (Chile)
- Location: Antofagasta Region, Chile; 22°18′19.66″S 068°54′08.07″W
- Products: Copper, gold
- Production: ▲289 kTon copper
- Financial year: 2024
- Opened: 1882
- Company: Codelco

Chuquicamata (/tʃuːkiːkəˈmɑːtə/ choo-kee-kə-MAH-tə; referred to as Chuqui for short) is the largest open pit copper mine in terms of excavated volume in the world. It is located in the north of Chile, just outside Calama, at 2,850 m (9,350 ft) above sea level. It is 215 km (134 mi) northeast of Antofagasta and 1,240 km (770 mi) north of the capital, Santiago. Flotation and smelting facilities were installed in 1952, and expansion of the refining facilities in 1968 made 500,000 tons annual copper production possible in the late 1970s. Previously part of Anaconda Copper, the mine is now owned and operated by Codelco, a Chilean state enterprise, since the Chilean nationalization of copper in the late 1960s and early 1970s. Its depth of 850 metres (2,790 ft) makes it the second deepest open-pit mine in the world, after Bingham Canyon Mine in Utah, United States.

For most of the 20th century Chuquicamata was the most productive copper mine in Chile until this position was overtaken by Escondida in 1996. Chuquicamata remained the 2nd most productive copper mine in Chile until 2011 when it was surpassed by Collahuasi and Radomiro Tomic. As of 2024 it was the fifth most productive copper mine in Chile with a produce that year of 289 kTon copper.

In April 2019 Chuquicamata started to extract minerals from its new underground mine, beginning its transition into an underground operation. While the above-ground mining was estimated to continue at most one and a half year from the start of underground operations, given their incompatibity, by May 2021 above-ground mining remained in place given delays in expanding the underground mine.

== Etymology ==
There are several versions of the meaning of Chuquicamata. The most widely known seems to be that it means the limit (camata) of the land of the Chuqui. Yet there is no record of any tribe called "chiqui" in the historical record, and the indigenous peoples known near the area are the Aymara, Quechua and Atacameño. Another interpretation is that it means metal (chuqui) tipped wooden (camata) spear. Yet another theory is that it means 'Cima de Oro' or 'Summit of Gold' in Aymara language. Some scholars consider the part chuqui analogous to that found in Quechua toponyms such as chuquisaca, chuquichuqui and chuquipú.

== History ==
Copper has been mined for centuries at Chuquicamata, as evidenced by the 1899 discovery of the "Copper Man," a mummy dated to c. 550 A.D. The mummy was found in an ancient mine shaft, apparently trapped by a rockfall. It is also related that the men of conquistador Diego de Almagro obtained copper horseshoes from the natives when he passed through in 1536.

Incas and Spanish explorers exploited the mineral deposits of Chuquicamata during the pre-colonial and colonial periods. Mining activity was relatively small scale until the War of the Pacific (1879–1883), when Chile annexed parts of both Peru and Bolivia, including Chuquicamata. At this time, a great influx of miners were drawn into the area by what was termed the 'Red Gold Fever' (La Fiebre del Oro Rojo). Soon, Chuquicamata was covered with mines and over 400 mining claims at one point. Pirquineros and Chilean and English companies mined the brochantite veins from 1879 to 1912. The development of the mines was helped by arrival of the railroad to Calama. Some copper mining were former nitrate miners. Ten individual mines (piques) existed in Chuquicamata until 1882 when these begun to consolidate and by 1883 the following mine claims existed in Chuquicamata; Zaragoza and Lérida, Amigos and San Luis. The property of the mines in Chuquicamata continued to change in the 1880s and 1890s.

It was a wild and disorganized camp. Title claims were often in doubt due to the defective 1873 Mining Code and matters were further complicated after the capture of Calama during the 1891 Chilean Civil War when rebels confiscated mines belonging to loyalists. Many miners lived in makeshift and lawless shanty towns around the mines, including Punta de Rieles, Placilla, and Banco Drummond. These settlements provided miners with alcohol, gambling, and prostitution and murder was an almost daily occurrence. The army had to be sent in to maintain order as late as 1918. The towns were eventually buried under the waste dumps to east of the mine.

These early operations mined high grade veins like the Zaragoza and Balmaceda veins, which contained concentrations of up to 10-15% copper, leaving low grade disseminated ore. One attempt was made to process the low-grade ore in 1899-1900 by Norman Walker, a partner in La Compañia de Cobres de Antofagasta, but the attempt failed, leaving the company deeply in debt. Mining was never really fully developed at this time because of a lack of water, isolation, difficulty communicating, lack of capital, and fluctuations in the copper price. Nevertheless, larger mining companies eventually emerged, organized as commercial companies rather than mining operations to work around problems with the mining code. These companies started to buy up and consolidate small mines and claims.

=== Beginning of modern mine and Guggenheim era (1910–1923) ===
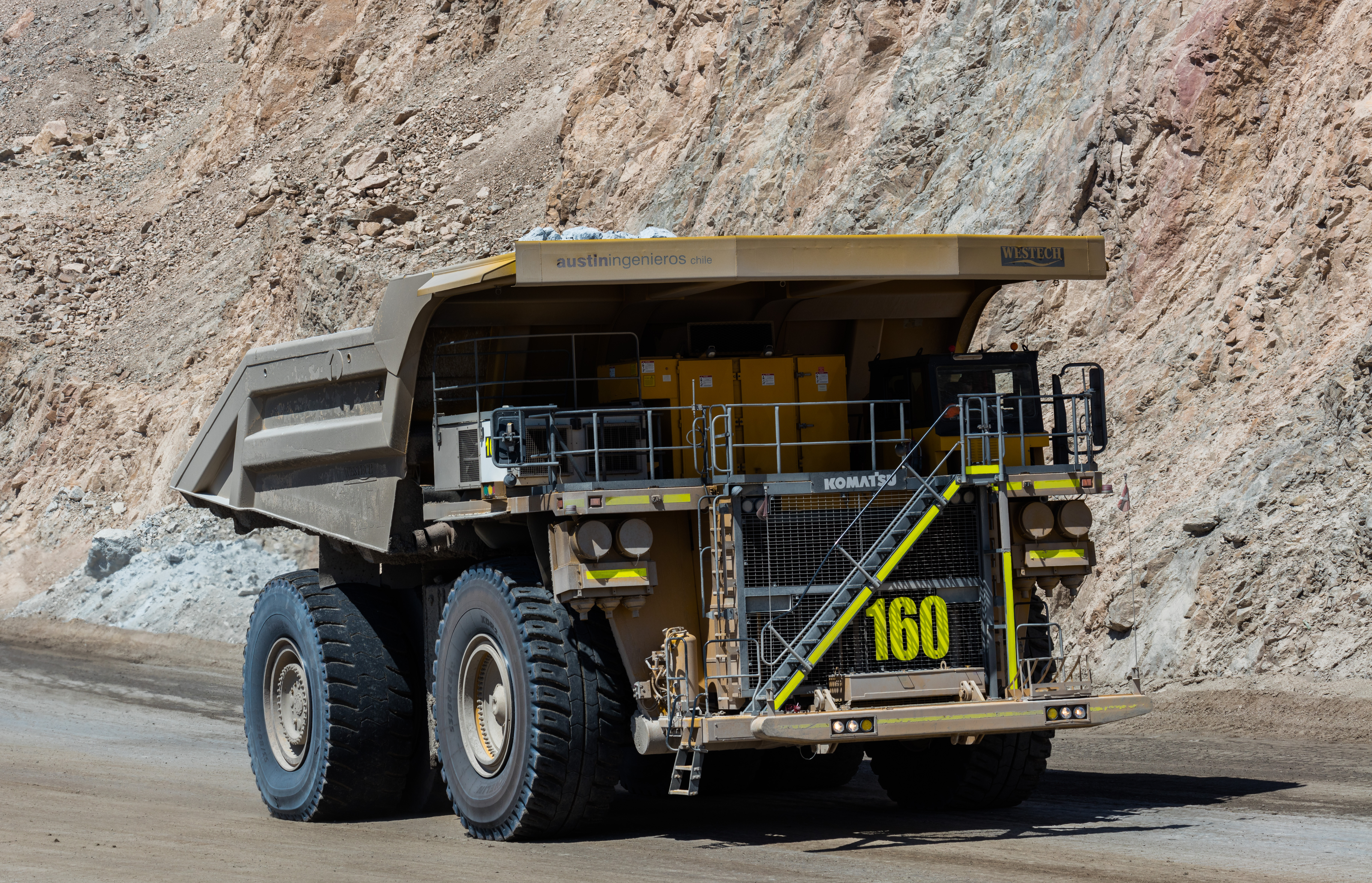
Haul truck in Chuquicamata in 2016.

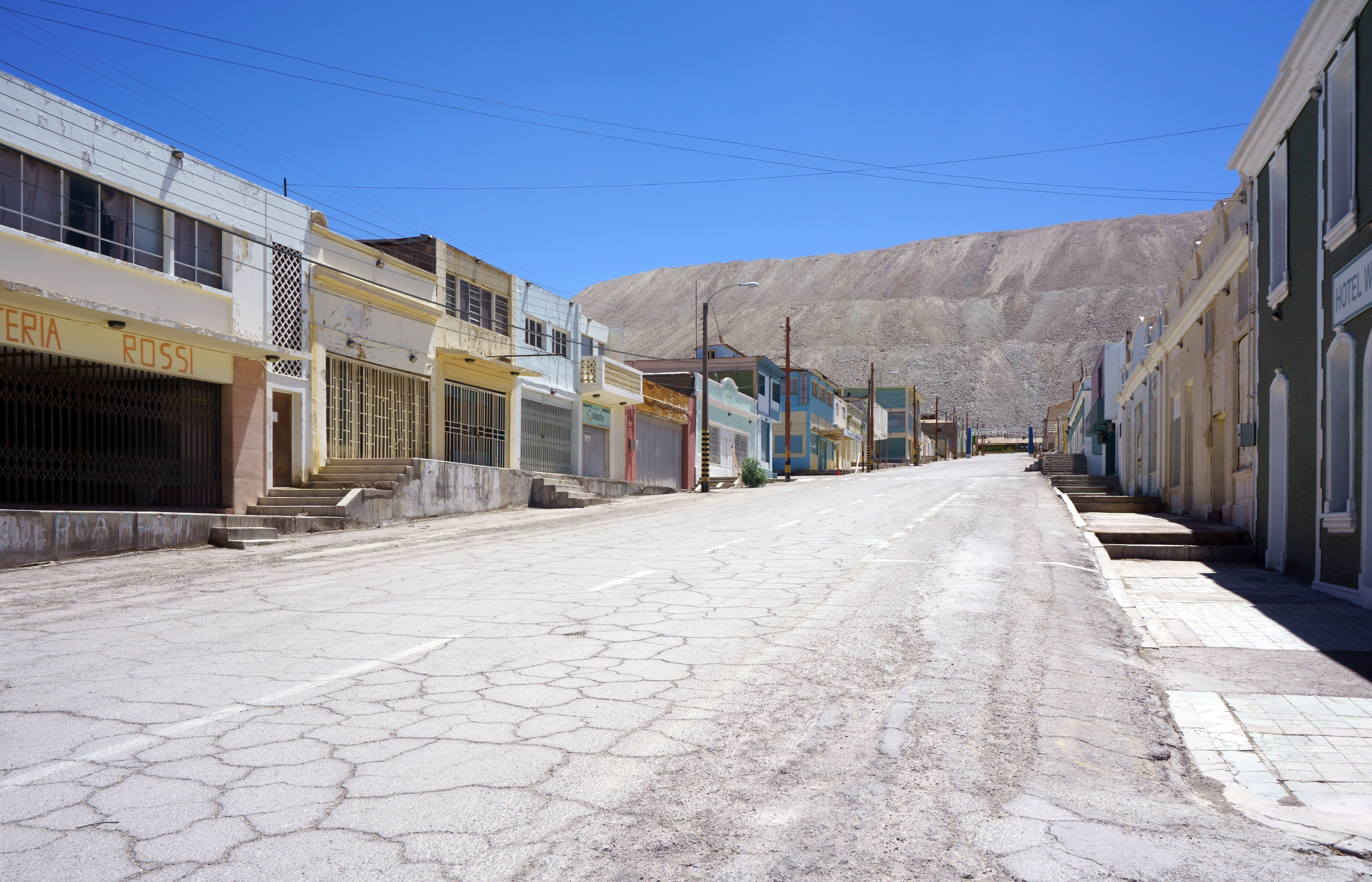
Chuquicamata ghost town

The modern era started when an American engineer named Bradley finally developed a method of processing low-grade oxidized copper ores. In 1910 he approached the lawyer and industrialist Albert C Burrage, who sent engineers to examine Chuquicamata. This was the beginning of copper mining by the Chile Exploration Company of the Guggenheim Group. Their reports found that the mine showed promise, and in April 1911, he started to buy up mines and claims, mainly from the larger mining companies, in association with Duncan Fox y Cia., an English entrepreneur.

Since Burrage did not have the capital to develop a mine, he approached the Guggenheim Brothers. They examined his claims and estimated the reserves at 690 million tonnes of 2.58% grade copper. The Guggenheims also had discovered a process for treating the low grade ores developed by Elias Anton Cappelen Smith and were immediately interested. They organised the Chile Exploration Company (Chilex) in January 1912 and eventually bought out Burrage for US$25 million (or $834 million today) in Chile's stock market.

Chile then went ahead with the development and construction of a mine on the eastern section of the Chuquicamata field, gradually expanding it to include the rest of the field over the next 15 years. A leaching plant was planned with a capacity to produce 50,000 tons of electrolytic copper annually. Among the equipment purchased were steam shovels from the Panama Canal. A port and an oil-fired power plant were built at Tocopilla, 140 km (90 mi) to the West and an aqueduct was constructed to bring water in from the Andes. Production started on May 18, 1915. Production rose from 4,345 tonnes in the first year to 50,400 tonnes in 1920.

Worker's protest in the 1910s centered on wages, work schedules and the price of goods in the groceries. Air pollution was commonplace and death rates high, in particular for women who did not work the propper mine. The gases coming from the production of sulphuric acid in the mine were blamed by writer Marcial Figueroa for many deaths in 1920s including newborn babies. Figeroa claims that in 1916, the company knowing these issues, nothing was changed. In a 1917 book of Laura Jorquera the poor conditions for the workers, the women and the children in Chuquicamata were denounced prompting Harry Guggenheim to respond to criticism in an article in Engineering and Mining Journal in 1920.

=== Anaconda Copper era (1923–1971) ===
The Guggenheims sold the mine to Anaconda Copper in 1923, and production increased to 135,890 tonnes by 1929 before the Great Depression hit and demand fell. The Guggenheim sought to disinvest in copper to invest in Chilean nitrates, something that in hindsight proved a bad choice.

Under the Anaconda Copper administration, housing, environmental and sanitary conditions for the workers improved and mortality rates decreased.

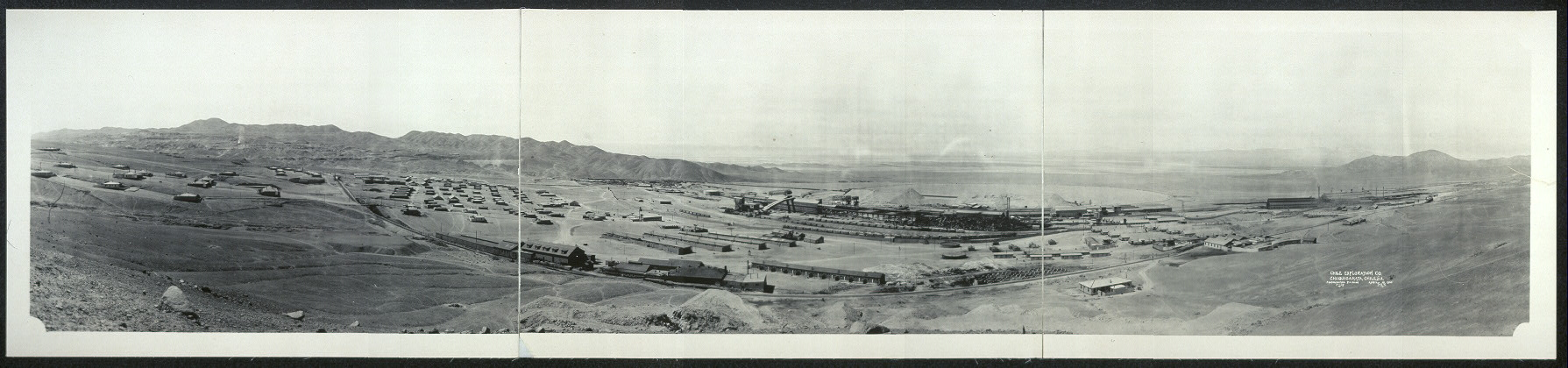
Chuquicamata in 1925

For many years, production came from the oxidized capping of the orebody, which only required leaching and then electrowinning the copper, but by 1951 the oxidized reserves were primarily exhausted. The company then built a mill, flotation plant and smelter to treat the enormous reserves of underlying supergene copper sulfides. These secondary sulfides arise from the leaching of the overlying ore and its re-deposition and replacement of the deeper primary (hypogene) sulfides.

In 1957, the Exótica deposit (South Mine) was discovered beneath tailings, and turned out to be the largest known deposit of exotic copper. This led Anaconda to build an oxide plant, concentrator, smelter, refinery, and town next to the mine, as well as a power plant in Tocopilla.

In 1951, a young Che Guevara documented visiting the mine with Alberto Granado in his memoir The Motorcycle Diaries, describing it as "[...] a scene from a modern drama. You cannot say that it's lacking in beauty, but it is a beauty without grace, imposing and glacial."

=== Codelco era (1971–present) ===
In 1971, the mine was nationalized and operations were then assumed by CODELCO.

For many years it was the mine with the largest annual production of copper in the world but was in 1996 overtaken by Minera Escondida. Nevertheless, it remained by far the mine with the largest total production (approximately 29 million tonnes) of copper until the end of 2007 (excluding Radomiro Tomić). Despite over 90 years of intensive exploitation, it remains one of the largest known copper resources. Its open pit is the world's largest at 4.3 km (2.7 mi) long, 3 km (1.9 mi) wide and over 900 m (3,000 ft) deep and its smelter and electrolytic refinery (855,000 tonnes p.a.) are among the world's largest. Chuquicamata is also a significant producer of molybdenum.

Chuquicamata is now amalgamated with the currently operational Radomiro Tomić mine to the north (on the same mineralized system), Ministro Hales mine to the south (formerly Mansa Mina) and the recently discovered 'Toki cluster' of copper porphyries to form the "'Codelco Norte'" division of Codelco.

In June 2025, Photographer Lorenzo Poli won the Earth Photo 2025 competition top prize, with his series of photos taken at the mine. The photos managed to capture the vastness of the site along with the ruined ghost town.

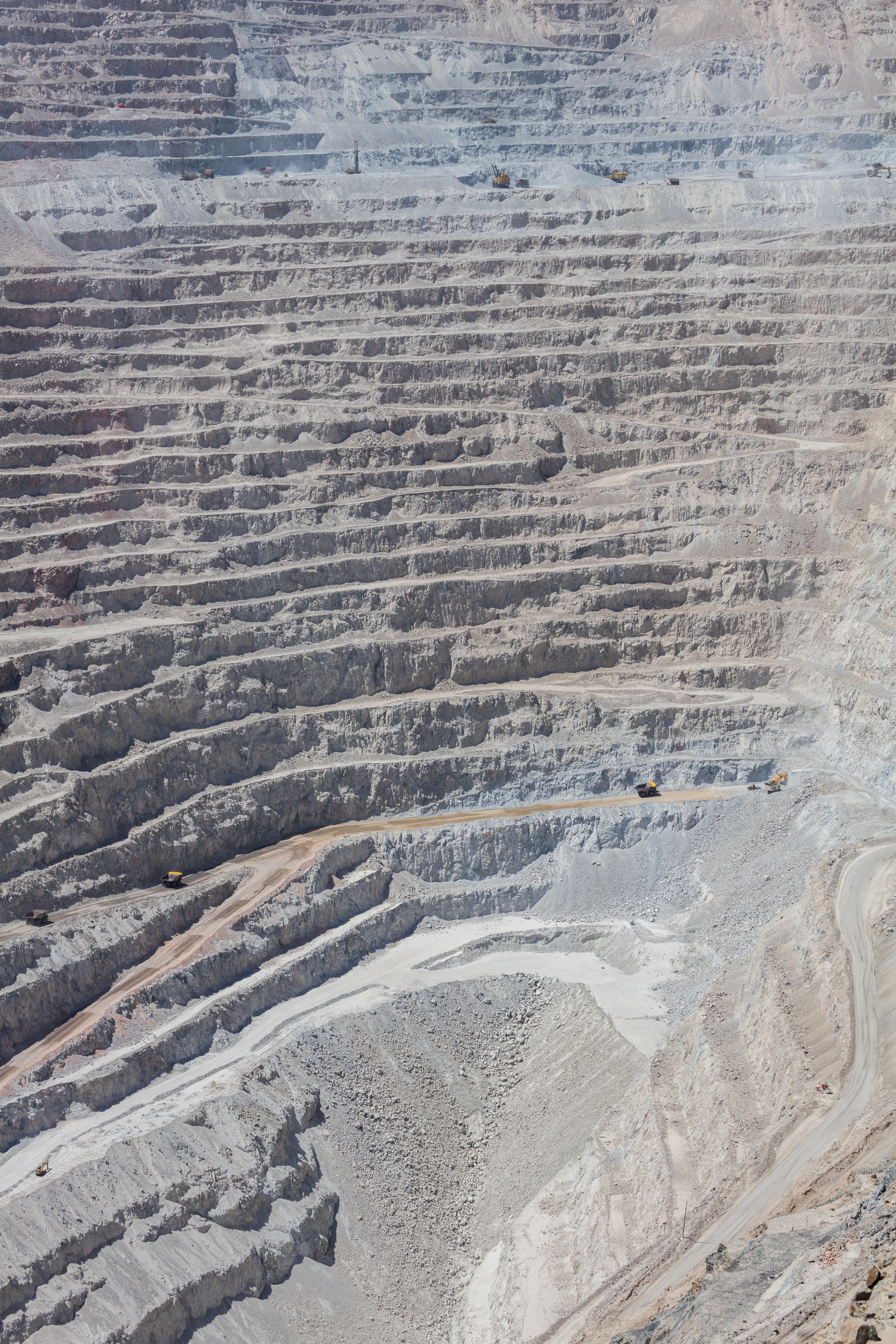
View of the wall

== Geology ==
Chuquicamata belongs to the broad class of porphyry copper deposits. Practically, the entire Chuquicamata orebody is hosted by the Chuqui Porphyry Complex, made up of East, Fine Texture, West and Banco porphyries. These Cu-Mo porphyry systems formed during the Eocene-Oligocene and exhibit classic "zoned alteration-mineralization features. A regional fault zone gave rise to hydrothermal activity which concentrated metal and sulfide minerals. The West Fault is a major fault that separates Chuquicamata into western and eastern parts. This fault is part of the Cenozoic West Fault System in Chile, extending several hundred kilometers in a general north-south to northeast strike direction. The Chuqui Porphyry Complex lies in the mineralized east part of the pit. In contrast, the barren Fortuna Complex lies in the west part.

A large proportion of the copper at Chuquicamata occurs in veins and veinlets filling faults and fault-related shatter zones. Pyrite is present everywhere, and chalcocite and covellite appears as both supergene and hypogene minerals. Molybdenite is conspicuous at Chuquicamata, almost all of it carried by quartz veins.

== Economic effects ==
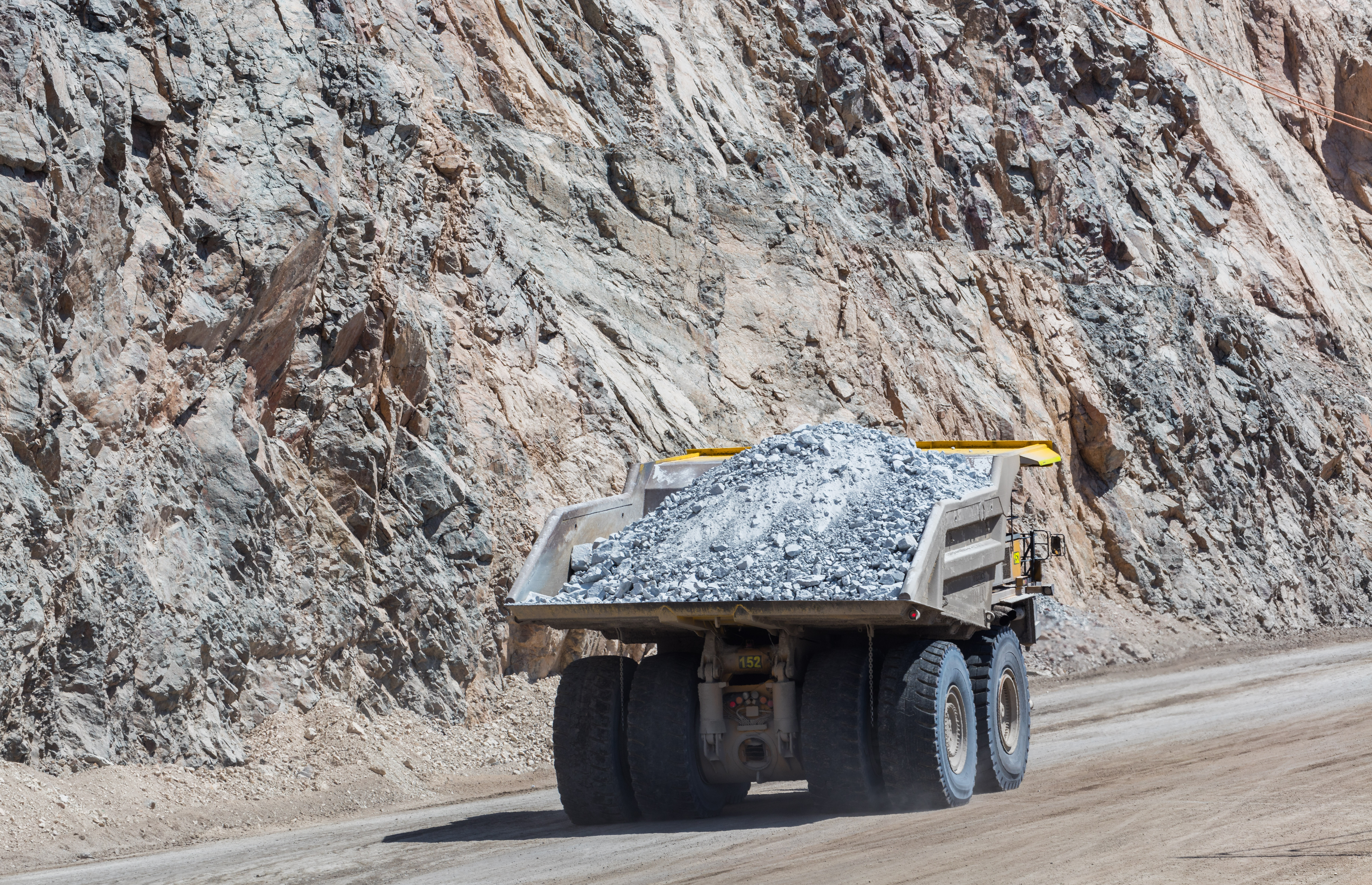
Haul truck in Chuquicamata

Copper mining has long been the most consistent Chilean export, and currently accounts for almost one-third of all foreign trade, down from a peak of almost 75%.

Copper has been mined in the land area between central Chile and southern Peru since the colonial period, but it was not until the 20th century that copper reached the same level of importance as other mineral exports such as saltpeter or silver. Before World War I, saltpeter was collected from abundant deposits of caliche in the Atacama Desert, and Chile was the primary source of nitrates in the world. After the war, the world market for saltpeter, Chile's main export at the time, collapsed because of the production of artificial nitrates, first synthesized in Germany through a combination of the Haber process and the Ostwald process. As a result, Chile's economy shifted toward dependence on the copper industry. During this period, copper was described as "Chile's salary".

By the late 1950s, the three largest copper mines in Chile were Chuquicamata, El Salvador mine, and El Teniente. Chuquicamata and El Salvador were owned and operated by the Anaconda Copper Company. These mines gave rise to largely self-contained and self-sustaining settlements, complete with housing for workers, water and electrical plants, schools, stores, railways, and police forces.

In 1971, Chile's newly elected president Salvador Allende nationalized the Chuquicamata mine. Anaconda lost two-thirds of its copper production. After the Chilean military overthrew Allende in a CIA-backed coup in 1973, the new military government paid Anaconda $250 million in compensation.

== Climate ==
Climate data for Chuquicamata, elevation 2,710 m (8,890 ft)
Month	Jan	Feb	Mar	Apr	May	Jun	Jul	Aug	Sep	Oct	Nov	Dec	Year
Mean daily maximum °C (°F)	21.7 (71.1)	22.6 (72.7)	21.8 (71.2)	21.6 (70.9)	21.1 (70.0)	16.8 (62.2)	17.6 (63.7)	18.6 (65.5)	18.4 (65.1)	19.8 (67.6)	20.3 (68.5)	21.2 (70.2)	20.1 (68.2)
Daily mean °C (°F)	14.7 (58.5)	14.2 (57.6)	13.2 (55.8)	11.8 (53.2)	11.0 (51.8)	8.2 (46.8)	8.2 (46.8)	9.5 (49.1)	10.1 (50.2)	11.1 (52.0)	11.3 (52.3)	12.7 (54.9)	11.3 (52.4)
Mean daily minimum °C (°F)	7.4 (45.3)	6.2 (43.2)	4.9 (40.8)	2.8 (37.0)	2.5 (36.5)	1.9 (35.4)	0.5 (32.9)	1.6 (34.9)	1.3 (34.3)	1.9 (35.4)	1.2 (34.2)	3.6 (38.5)	3.0 (37.4)
Average precipitation mm (inches)	0.0 (0.0)	0.0 (0.0)	3.4 (0.13)	0.0 (0.0)	1.9 (0.07)	0.0 (0.0)	1.9 (0.07)	0.0 (0.0)	1.8 (0.07)	0.0 (0.0)	0.0 (0.0)	0.0 (0.0)	9 (0.34)
Source: Bioclimatografia de Chile

== See also ==
- Chañarcillo
- Los Pelambres
- Potrerillos, Chile
- Geology of Chile
- Mir mine
