= Chile mining accident =

Chile mining accident may refer to:

- 1945 El Teniente mining accident, the biggest metallic mining accident in history
- 2006 Copiapó mining accident, which resulted in two deaths
- 2010 Copiapó mining accident, in which 33 miners were trapped for 69 days
