= Sean O'Hollaren =

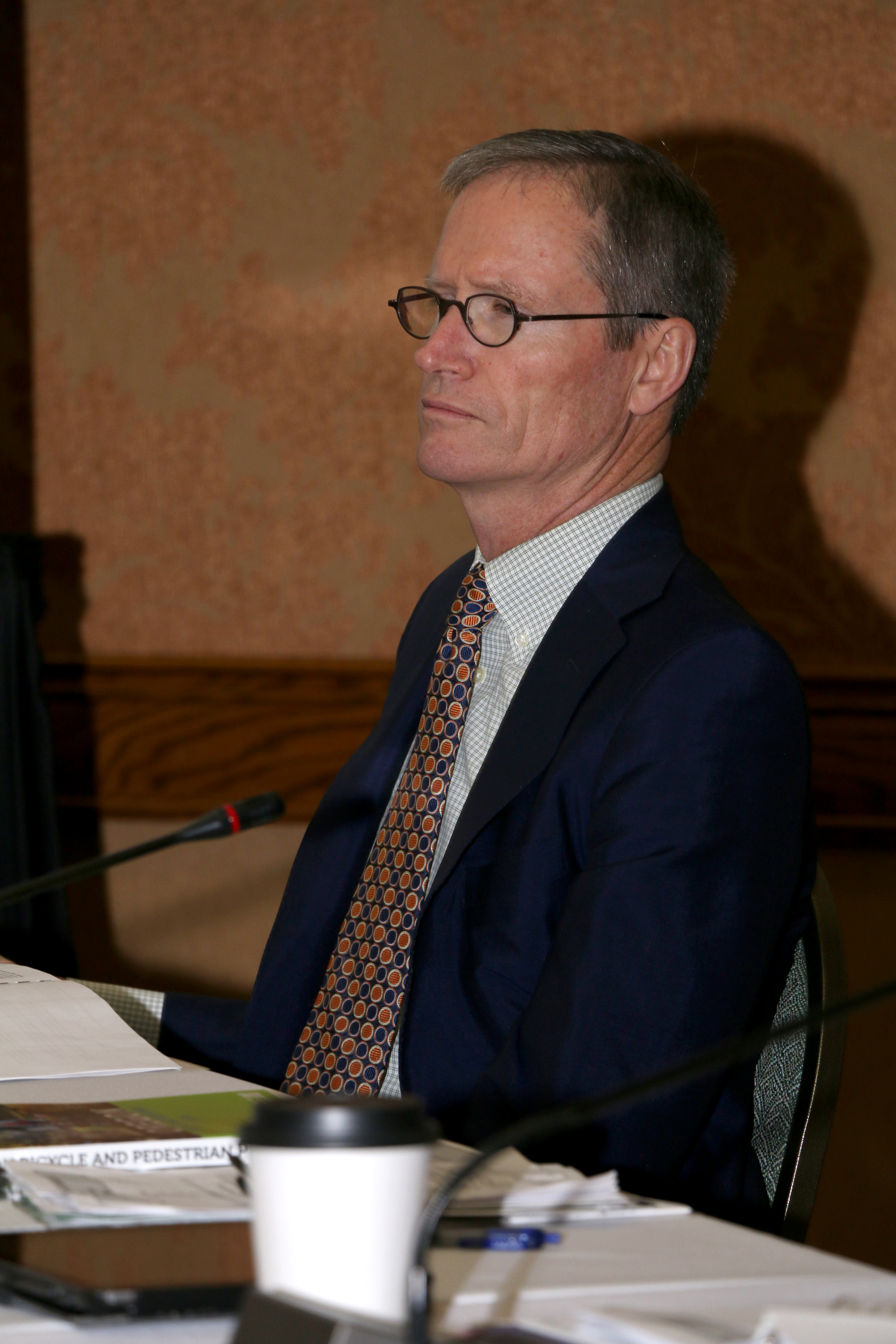
Sean O'Hollaren (2016)

Sean O'Hollaren is American business executive and government official. He was a Commissioner at the Port of Portland from June 2018 to December 2022, serving as the Commissions Treasurer during the Port's largest capital expansion. In 2023 he served as Chief External Affairs Officer at Albemarle, a global specialty chemicals company. In October 2025, he became Senior Vice President, Government and External Affairs, NetJets/FlightSafety based in Columbus, Ohio.

== Education ==
In 1979–1983, O'Hollaren earned his Bachelor of Science degree in Political Science and Psychology from Willamette University in Salem, Oregon, where he now serves as a Trustee.

In 1989–1990, he completed the Certificate program in Business Management at Georgetown University.

== Career ==
His career start was as an intern on the U.S. Senate Committee on Commerce, Science and Transportation. From March 1985 to March 1989, he served as Legislative Assistant to U.S. Senators Bob Packwood Mark O. Hatfield, Washington, D.C.

From March 1989, he was Professional Staff on the U.S. Senate Committee on Appropriations, Washington, D.C. In 1992, he joined Union Pacific Corp as Director of Tax and Environment. He remained there until March 2001.

In May 2001, he was confirmed to the post of Assistant Secretary of Transportation, Legislative and Intergovernmental Affairs, serving under Sec. Norman Mineta, during the 9/11 attacks and the creation of the Transportation Security Administration and creation of the Department of Homeland Security.

In June 2003, President George W. Bush tapped him to serve as Special Assistant to the President in the White House Office of Legislative Affairs, where he also served as Deputy Assistant to the President, heading up the White House liaison to the U.S. Senate.

In 2007, he returned to the private sector, joining Honeywell as vice president, Global Government Relations. In November 2012, he joined Nike, Inc. as Senior Vice President, Government and Public Affairs, where he served until his retirement in December 2020.

In 2017 — 2020, O'Hollaren served as chairman of the Board of Directors of the World Federation of the Sporting Goods Industry, based in Berne, Switzerland. In 2018 O'Hollaren was appointed by Oregon Governor Kate Brown to the Port of Portland Commission. In November 2022, he was appointed as CEAO at Albemarle, Inc. in Charlotte, N.C. He left the company on August 14, 2023.
