= William Braden =

William Braden may refer to:

- William W. Braden (1837–1897), American politician in Minnesota
- William Robert Braden (1858–1922), Canadian politician in British Columbia
- William Braden (businessman) (1871–1942), American businessman of copper mining in Chile
- William Braden, an American film-maker best known for Henri, le Chat Noir

== See also ==
- Bill Braden (born 1954), Canadian politician and news reporter
