= Minera Escondida =

Chilean mining company

Coordinates: 24°16′10″S 69°04′14″W

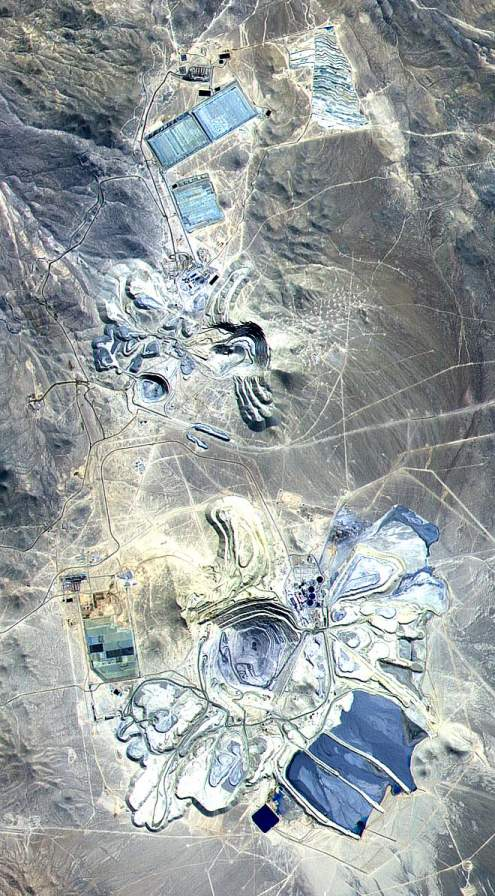
False color satellite image of the Escondida Mine, courtesy of NASA

Minera Escondida (which means 'hidden' in Spanish) is a mining company that operates the Escondida copper mine which is composed of two open pits in the Atacama Desert, 170 km southeast of Antofagasta in northern Chile. It is currently the highest producing copper mine in the world. Its 2007 production of 1.483 million tons of the metal was worth US$10.12 billion, mainly as metal in concentrate, but some as cathode, and was 9.5% of world output and 26% of Chilean production, according to the US Geological Survey's preliminary estimates of 2007 world mine output.

== Overview ==
It is so called because the main orebody does not outcrop on the surface, but is 'hidden' by hundreds of metres of practically barren overburden. The lower open pit in the satellite image on the right is the main Escondida mine, but the upper two are Barrick Gold's Zaldívar mine. The second Escondida open pit, Escondida Norte, had not been established when the image was taken, but is now immediately to the right (east) of the larger Zaldívar pit.

Escondida produces mainly copper concentrates, which are piped as a slurry down to the port of Coloso, where they are dewatered before shipping, and a smaller proportion of cathode copper from the leaching of both oxide and low grade sulfide ore. It also produces gold and silver.

The mine is owned 57.5% by BHP; 30% by Rio Tinto; and 10% by JECO Corp, a Japanese joint venture established in 1988 by Mitsubishi, with 70% ownership; Nippon Mining & Metals, with 20% ownership; Mitsubishi Materials with a 10% share, adding 2.5% ownership by JECO 2 Ltd., another joint venture incorporated in 2010, "to increase their ownership in Escondida by 2.5%," with an ownership structure of 50% Mitsubishi Corp, 40% Nippon Mining & Metals, and 10% Mitsubishi Materials. Escondida is managed by a seven-person Owners' Council designated by the four owners, and is both the largest known copper reserve and the largest foreign investment in Chile.

2006 financial reports showed a cumulative investment of US$5.64 billion, and at year end June 2013, Escondida accounted for approximately 5 percent of all copper production.

The mining company holds The Copper Mark environmental certificate.

== History ==
In 1978, J David Lowell proposed an exploration program along the porphyry copper belt between Chuquicamata in the north and El Salvador in the south. Minera Utah de Chile and Getty Mining (Chile) formed a joint venture to carry it out. On March 14, 1981, 'Pozo 6' the last scheduled borehole in the program, hit 52 metres of 1.51% copper at a depth of 240 metres and discovered the main Escondida orebody. More holes were drilled to delineate the orebody and a shaft was sunk to provide bulk samples for metallurgical testing. Construction of the mine started in 1988, which including the stripping of over 180 million tonnes of waste to get to the orebody.

The Los Colorados concentrator started up at 35,000 tonnes per day in November 1990, and the first concentrate shipment was made at the end of the year. Expansion has been steady since then. In 1994, an ammonia leach plant to produce copper cathode from a portion of the concentrates was started up in Coloso, but was not economic and closed down four years later. In 1998, the oxide ore leaching plant was started up, which now has a capacity of 150,000 tonnes of copper cathode annually. Also in 1998, the Los Colorados concentrator was expanded to 120,000 tonnes per day. A second concentrator, the 110,000 tonnes per day Laguna Seca mill, started up in 2002, the Escondida Norte pit started production in 2005, and in 2006 a sulphide bioleach plant with an annual capacity 180,000 tonnes of cathode started up, as did a desalination plant in Coloso.

Ownership changed when BHP acquired Utah Mining and then Texaco acquired Getty Oil and sold off its mineral interests. BHP bought these and then sold a 30% interest to Rio Tinto and 10% to JECO. It subsequently sold 2.5% to the International Finance Corporation.

=== 2006 strike action ===
After months of negotiations where workers demanded a 13% salary adjustment among other benefits in August 2006 mine workers organized in a union at Escondida went to strike for a total of 25 days. The strike ended after the company conceded to most demands and a 5% salary rise.

=== 2022–2024 groundwater lawsuits ===
Starting in 2022 indigenous Atacameño people sued Minera Escondida, Albemarle and Minera Zaldívar over damages to the Monturaqui-Negrillar-Tilopozo Aquifer. The lawsuit was joined by the Chilean state's Consejo de Defensa del Estado. Minera Escondida argued for its part that any effects of its water extraction have not had time to manifest downstream at the observation sites, due to the slow movement of groundwater, and hence that it was the extraction of the other two companies that had impacted it. The lawsuit ended in December 2024 in a conciliation agreement in which Minera Escondida and the other two companies were to compensate economically, socially and environmentally the indigenous Comunidad de Peine as well as paying for damages to the meadows of Tilopozo and the lakes of La Punta and La Brava.

== Chilean economy and the world copper market ==
Escondida has become an important part of the Chilean economy. According to the CIA World Factbook, the mine's 2007 sales of US$10.21 billion were 4.3% of estimated 2007 GDP of US$234.4 billion and about 15% of exports. At the end of 2006, the company employed directly some 2,951 workers and 3,158 contractors

The average copper price in 2007 rose to US$3.23/lb compared with the mine's total direct costs of only 60.8 cents/lb, which fell partly as a result of sharply lower treatment and refining costs charged by smelters. The operation was thus highly profitable and paid US$2.2 billion in taxes to the Chilean treasury.

As a result of its considerable size relative to the world copper market, developments at Escondida can have dramatic effects on the world copper price as was shown by its gyrations during the strike in August 2006. The strike was called because the workers felt they were not sharing in the very high profits being made by the company on the back of the record copper price. The workers initially demanded a 13% pay rise plus a bonus of $30,000, but eventually settled for a 5% increase, a $17,000 bonus and a number of other minor benefits. The company managed to keep production at 40% of normal levels, but the union eventually blockaded the road to the mine on 16 August. On 18 August, Escondida declared force majeure and stopped production.

Arturo Martinez, the chairman of the Central Unitaria de Trabajadores, (CUT, an association of Chilean trade unionists) met with the Escondida workers on 17 August 2006, and said that "what is happening at Escondida puts back onto the agenda a new nationalisation of copper, lo que ocurre en Escondida pone a la orden del día una nueva nacionalización del cobre.

== See also ==
- Chilean nationalization of copper
