= Sewell, Chile =

UNESCO World Heritage Site
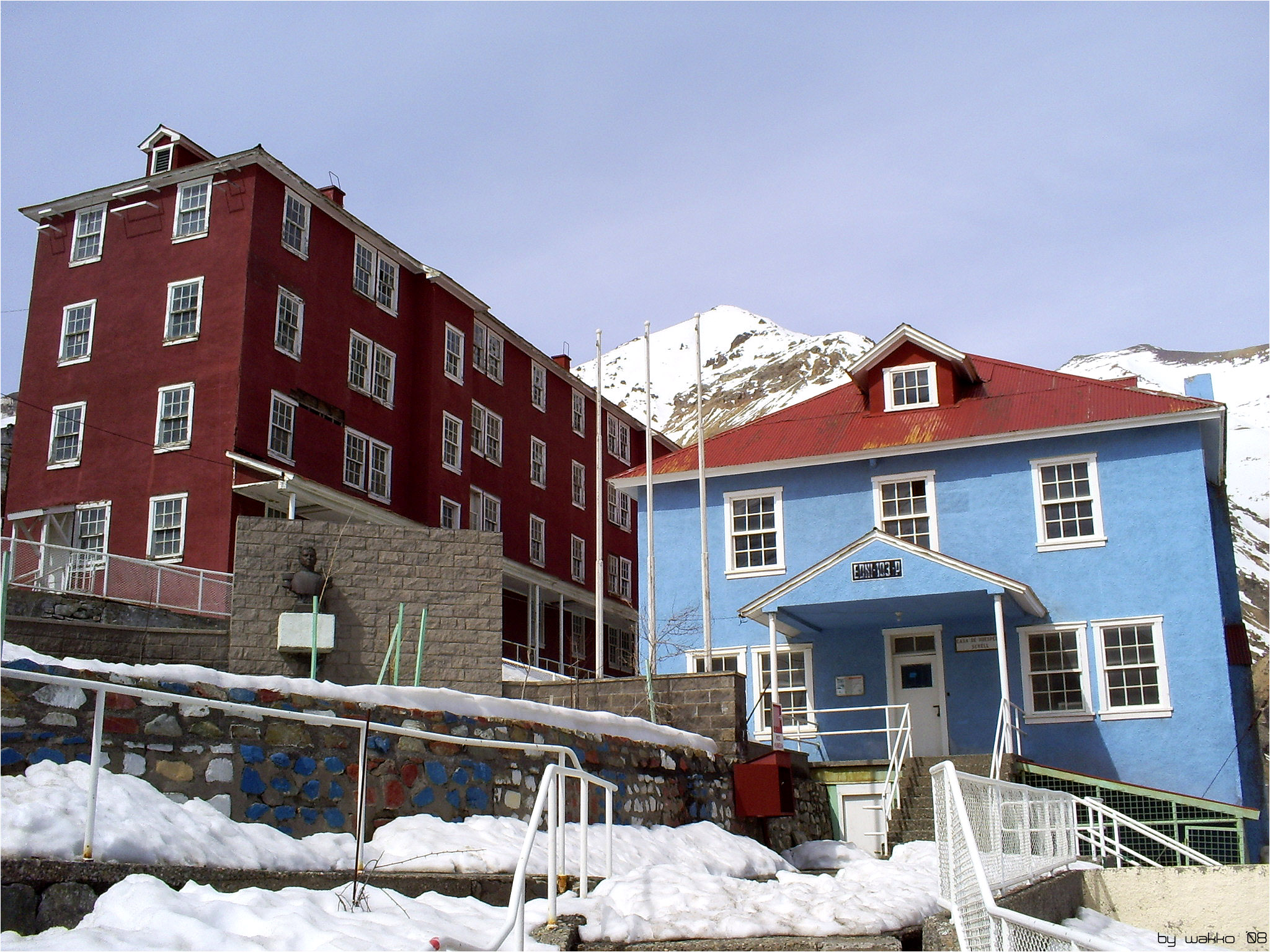

- Location within Chile
- Official name: Sewell Mining Town
- Location: Machalí, Cachapoal Province, O'Higgins Region, Chile
- Criteria: Cultural: (ii)
- Reference: 1214
- Inscription: 2006 (30th Session)
- Area: 17.2 ha (43 acres)
- Buffer zone: 33 ha (82 acres)
- Website: www.sewell.cl/english/index.html
- Coordinates: 34°5′4″S 70°22′58″W

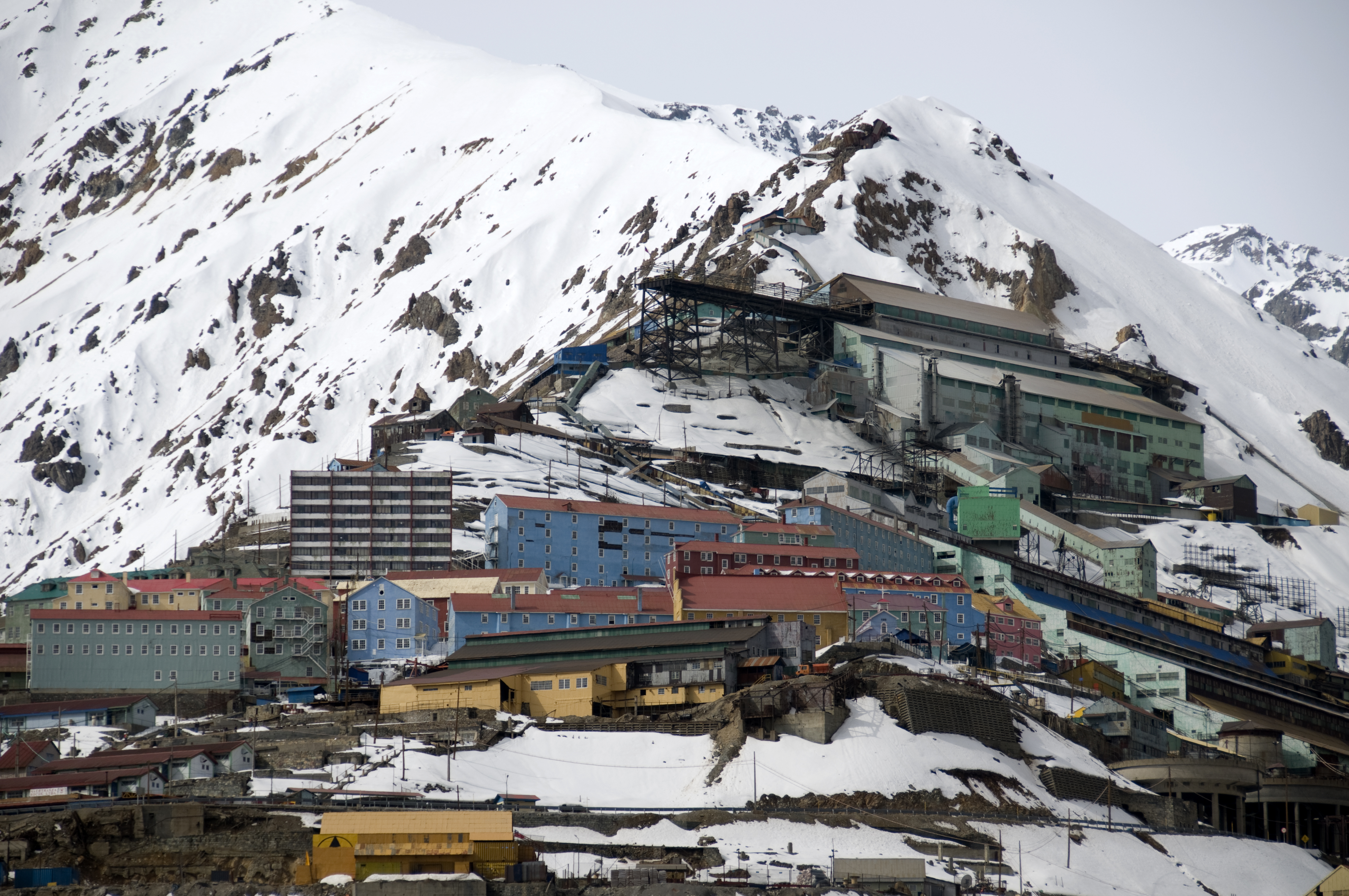
Sewell, Chile

Sewell is an uninhabited Chilean mining town located on the slopes of the Andes in the commune of Machalí in Cachapoal Province, Libertador General Bernardo O'Higgins Region, at an altitude of between 2,000 and 2,250 metres. In 2006, it was designated as a UNESCO World Heritage Site. It is known as a former company town, developed by Braden Copper Company for housing the workers (and their families) associated with the operations of El Teniente, the largest underground copper mine in the world.

At the town's peak in 1960, some 16,000 people lived here. After the government acquired a majority interest in the mine, and even more so after copper mining was nationalized in 1971, the government company moved workers into the valley. It built the Copper Highway to provide commuting access for them to the mine and related operations. While some buildings were demolished in the 1980s, others have now been renovated for contract workers, and restored as part of preservation of this historic site. The Chilean government designated it in 1998 as a National Monument.

== History ==
The town was founded in 1906 by the Braden Copper Company as a company town to support extracting copper from the El Teniente mine. It was named after the company's first president, Barton Sewell.

During the Great Depression, the Braden Copper Company became a subsidiary of Kennecott Copper Company. In 1917 the foundry or smelter was moved from Sewell to Caletones, where another town developed around it.

Originally male workers lived in shared housing at Sewell, called colectivos. Later family housing was added. Playgrounds, plazas, shops, and a movie theatre were later developed. Pedestrians walked up and down vertical staircases to reach the different levels of the town. Streets ran horizontally and were unpaved because of severe winter conditions. There were no cars. On the west-facing side of Cerro Negro, a camp for foreign personnel developed.

Ore was taken down the mountainside to Graneros, where it was loaded onto railway cars. The narrow gauge railway that connected Sewell to the nearby town of Rancagua, 32 kilometres (20 mi) away, was under construction in 1906 and was completed in 1911. The total distance covered was 72 kilometres (45 mi) with an elevation change of 1,500 metres (5,000 ft).

By 1915 a hospital, a fire department, and a social club had been built and established in Sewell. The buildings and homes were made out of timber, and painted bright colors such as yellow, red and blue. At its peak in 1960, it had more than 16,000 inhabitants. By 1918 the town housed more than 12,000 people.

Sewell is known as the "City of Staircases". The town was built on terrain too steep for wheeled vehicles, around a large central staircase, called the Escalara Central, which was built from the railway station. All supplies had to be brought into the city via a narrow gauge railroad. Pueblo Hundido contained the living quarters, while below the ore body was El Establecimiento, which contained the concentrator, hydroelectric plant, and a tramway.

On 8 August 1944, 102 people died in an avalanche when the slopes above the town failed. Additional, ever-present threats to the city included earthquakes, avalanches and explosions from mine operations.

In June 1945, 355 workers died in El Teniente mine from carbon monoxide poisoning, and another 747 were injured, because smoke spread through the mine from a fire outside, in what became locally known as the 'Smoke Tragedy'. This disaster resulted in the government developing and adopting more safety regulations.

=== Decline ===
In 1967 the Kennecott Copper Corporation relinquished its sole ownership of the site when the Chilean government bought a 51% stake in the company. At this time, many people were moved from Sewell to Rancagua. The government built the Copper Highway for their commuting to the mine and related operations.

In 1971 the mine was nationalised by the Allende government. In 1977, the state-owned CODELCO (Corporación Nacional del Cobre de Chile) started moving more families out of Sewell into the valley. The company town had been active for more than seven decades, and supported the construction and exploitation of the largest underground mine in the world. CODELCO began demolition of buildings in the town.

=== Preservation ===
Numerous supporters argued to have the town preserved because of its significance to Chilean history and its unusual site in the Andes. Demolition was halted at the end of the 1980s. In 1998 the Chilean Government declared Sewell a National Monument. In 1999 Chile's College of Architects declared Sewell to be one of the country's 10 most important urban works. Nine books have been written about life at Sewell. In 2006 UNESCO designated it as a World Heritage Site, based on Chile's nomination and assessment of its significance.

During the 1980s some of the remaining buildings were remodeled to house thousands of contract workers at the mine, but they were later moved out. Other buildings have been restored in order to preserve the nature of the original town. Some 50 restored buildings remain, and a history museum is housed in one of the structures.

CODELCO uses several buildings for offices. Now only the basic company facilities required for mining remain in the town. The area is not accessible by private vehicles. The government allows visitors only through tour operators from Santiago and Rancagua.

== Climate ==
Due to its elevation, Sewell has a warm-summer mediterranean climate (Csb, according to the Köppen climate classification), as at least 4 months see an average temperature above 10 °C (50 °F), having dry, moderate summers and cool, wet (sometimes snowy) winters.

Climate data for Sewell, elevation 2,134 m (7,001 ft)
| Month | Jan | Feb | Mar | Apr | May | Jun | Jul | Aug | Sep | Oct | Nov | Dec | Year |
|---|---|---|---|---|---|---|---|---|---|---|---|---|---|
| Mean daily maximum °C (°F) | 20.2 (68.4) | 19.7 (67.5) | 18.4 (65.1) | 16.1 (61.0) | 12.2 (54.0) | 8.7 (47.7) | 9.1 (48.4) | 9.5 (49.1) | 11.4 (52.5) | 14.1 (57.4) | 16.1 (61.0) | 18.7 (65.7) | 14.5 (58.2) |
| Daily mean °C (°F) | 15.2 (59.4) | 14.5 (58.1) | 13.2 (55.8) | 10.9 (51.6) | 7.5 (45.5) | 4.0 (39.2) | 4.4 (39.9) | 4.5 (40.1) | 6.1 (43.0) | 8.6 (47.5) | 10.9 (51.6) | 13.8 (56.8) | 9.5 (49.0) |
| Mean daily minimum °C (°F) | 10.2 (50.4) | 9.9 (49.8) | 8.7 (47.7) | 6.5 (43.7) | 3.6 (38.5) | 0.4 (32.7) | 0.5 (32.9) | 0.3 (32.5) | 1.7 (35.1) | 3.9 (39.0) | 6.1 (43.0) | 8.7 (47.7) | 5.0 (41.1) |
| Average precipitation mm (inches) | 12.8 (0.50) | 13.3 (0.52) | 16.6 (0.65) | 45.4 (1.79) | 197.8 (7.79) | 227.6 (8.96) | 192.9 (7.59) | 156.7 (6.17) | 96.2 (3.79) | 52.2 (2.06) | 33.8 (1.33) | 6.9 (0.27) | 1,052.2 (41.42) |
| Average relative humidity (%) | 40 | 43 | 43 | 43 | 55 | 64 | 60 | 61 | 55 | 51 | 46 | 41 | 50 |
Source: Bioclimatografia de Chile

== See also ==
- Rancagua
- Chilean nationalization of copper
- List of towns in Chile
- La Rinconada, Peru
