= Escondida =

Open-pit copper mine in Chile

- Location within Antofagasta Region Location within Chile
- Location: Commune of Antofagasta, Antofagasta Region, Chile; 24.27°S 69.07°W
- Products: Copper, gold
- Production: ▲1277,500 tonnes copper
- Financial year: 2024
- Discovered: 1981
- Opened: 1991
- Company: Minera Escondida: BHP (57.5%); Rio Tinto (30%); JECO Corporation (10%); JECO 2 Ltd (2.5%)

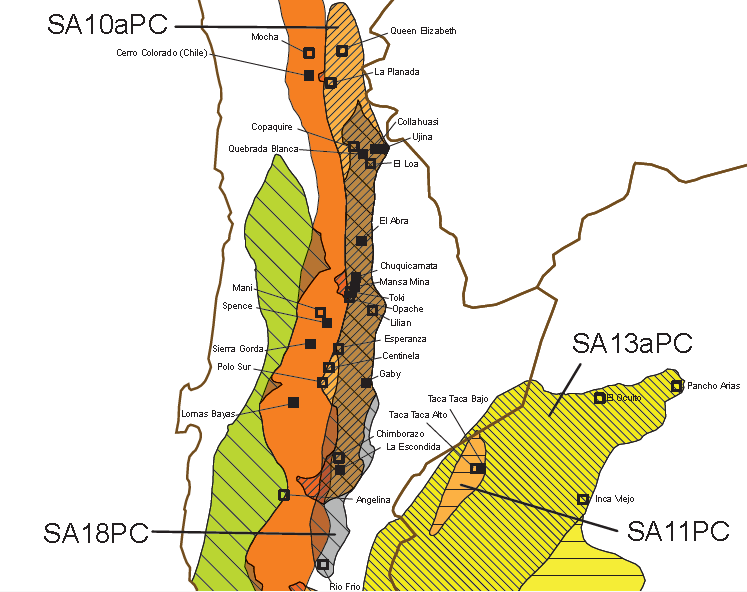
Location of the La Escondida and Chuquicamata copper mines in Chile

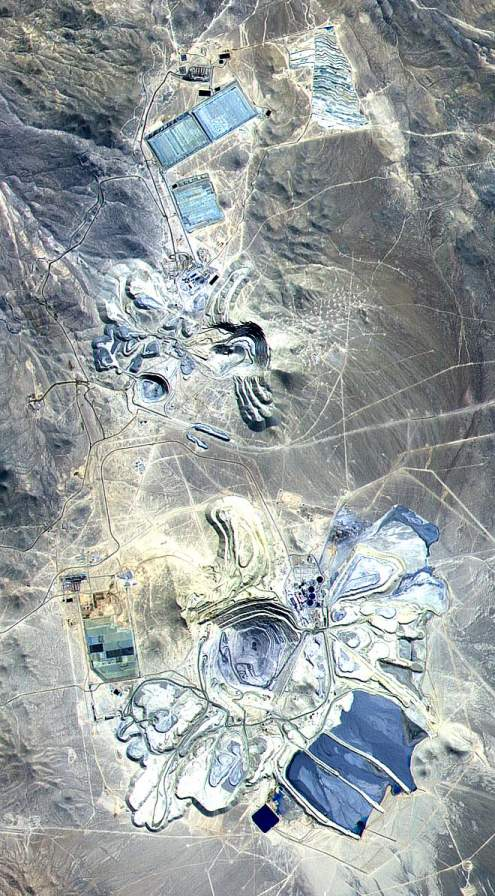
False color satellite image of Escondida (bottom) and neighbouring Zaldívar mines (top), April 2000

Escondida is a large open-pit copper mine at 3,100 m (10,200 ft) elevation in the Atacama Desert in Antofagasta Region, Chile. It has for decades been one of world's most productive copper mines and is the mine that leads in copper and gold production in Chile. In 2019 it was estimated that the mine and its ancillary industries generated 2.5% of Chile's GDP. The mine's produce is largely exported to China as ore concentrate that contained as of 2020 an estimate of 4% chalcopyrite, 35% chalcocite and 46% pyrite.

As of 2024 Escondida has each year been the most productive copper mine in Chile since 1996 more than doubling the produce of the next largest mine, Collahuasi, in four of the last ten years up to 2024.

== Geology ==
The Escondida deposit is one of a cluster of porphyry coppers in an elongated area about 18 km (11 mi) north–south and 3 km (1.9 mi) east–west and is associated with the West Fissure (Falla Oeste) system, which is in turn associated with most of the major Chilean porphyry deposits. A barren, leached cap, in places up to 180 m (590 ft) thick, overlies a thick zone of high grade secondary supergene mineralisation of the main orebody, largely chalcocite and covellite, which in turn overlies the unaltered primary mineralisation of chalcopyrite, bornite and pyrite.

=== Reserves ===
At mid 2007, Escondida had total proven and probable reserves of 34.7 million tonnes of copper, of which 22.5 million tonnes is estimated to be recoverable. Total resources (including reserves) were 57.6 million tonnes of copper, of which 33.0 million tonnes should be recovered. Exploration continues. As of 2019, the known resource is 21.7 Billion tonnes at 0.54 percent Copper including Escondida and adjacent deposits. The mine and ancillary industries contribute 2.5% to Chile's GDP.

== Operation ==
Escondida started operations on 14 March 1991. Sulfide ore, which contributes 77% of the recoverable copper reserve, is crushed and milled in one of the two concentrators and the copper concentrate is separated out using froth flotation. Approximately 86% of the copper is recovered. It is piped down to the port of Coloso, where it is dewatered before shipping. Oxide ore, 4% of recoverable copper, is crushed, agglomerated and then acid leached in large heaps, and the copper is recovered from the leach solutions as copper cathode in a solvent extraction/electrowinning (SX/EW) plant. Recovery is 68%. The low grade sulfide ore contributes 19% of recoverable copper. It is also crushed and dumped on large heaps, but here the leaching occurs through oxidation induced by microorganisms. The copper is also recovered by SX/EW.

In 2006, 338.6 million tonnes were mined (928,000 tonnes per day), of which 251.5 million tonnes were waste and oxide ore. Sulphide ore totalled 87.1 million tonnes or 239,000 tonnes per day. The two camps, San Lorenzo and 2000, cater to 7,000 people daily. Escondida's current capacity is around 1.4 million tonnes of copper production per year, making it the largest copper mine in the world.

Construction of work force accommodation camps and field offices are needed services in order to have the mine operating, on this note Tecno Fast in 2012 was hired to build the second phase of the respective workforce accommodation camp for Escondida Mine.

BHP buys 3 TWh of electricity per year to operate the Escondida and Spence mines (1,640 m (5,380 ft) elevation), where solar energy is more than 3 kWh/m^{2} per year.

According to Minera Escondida its northern pit, known as Rajo Norte, begun operating exclusively with self-driving trucks in late July 2025.

=== Water consumption ===
From 1998 to 2019 Escondida supplied itself with freshwater from a well field in the Monturaqui area of the Monturaqui-Negrillar-Tilopozo Aquifer located 78 km (48 mi) east of the mine. This well field had an installed capacity to extract 1,400 L/s (49 cu ft/s). In 2022 Escondida along with lithium-extracting company Albemarle and the nearby copper mine Zaldívar were brought to court over excessive groundwater extraction with associated damages to the environment and to the indigenous Atacameño people. Minera Escondida argued in courts that any effects of its water extraction have not had time to manifest downstream at the meadows of Tilopozo, due to the slow movement of groundwater, and hence that it was the extraction of the other two companies that had impacted it. In 2024 the First Environmental Court of Antofagasta ordered Minera Escondida to pay more than US$8 million in compensations related to the case.

In 2005, Degrémont Industry was asked to install a new Sea Water Reverse Osmosis desalination plant with a capacity to produce 45 ML (1.6×10^{6} cu ft) of fresh water per day.

As of 2024 present Escondida is wholly supplied with freshwater from a desalination plant near Caleta Coloso in the coast.

== 2006 strike action ==
After months of negotiations where workers demanded a 13% salary adjustment among other benefits in August 2006 mine workers organized in a union at Escondida went to strike for a total of 25 days. The strike ended after the company conceded to most demands and a 5% salary rise.

== See also ==
- El Teniente
- El Salvador mine
- Los Pelambres mine
- Potrerillos, Chile
- Chañarcillo
