= William Braden Burford =

American engineer (1871–1942)

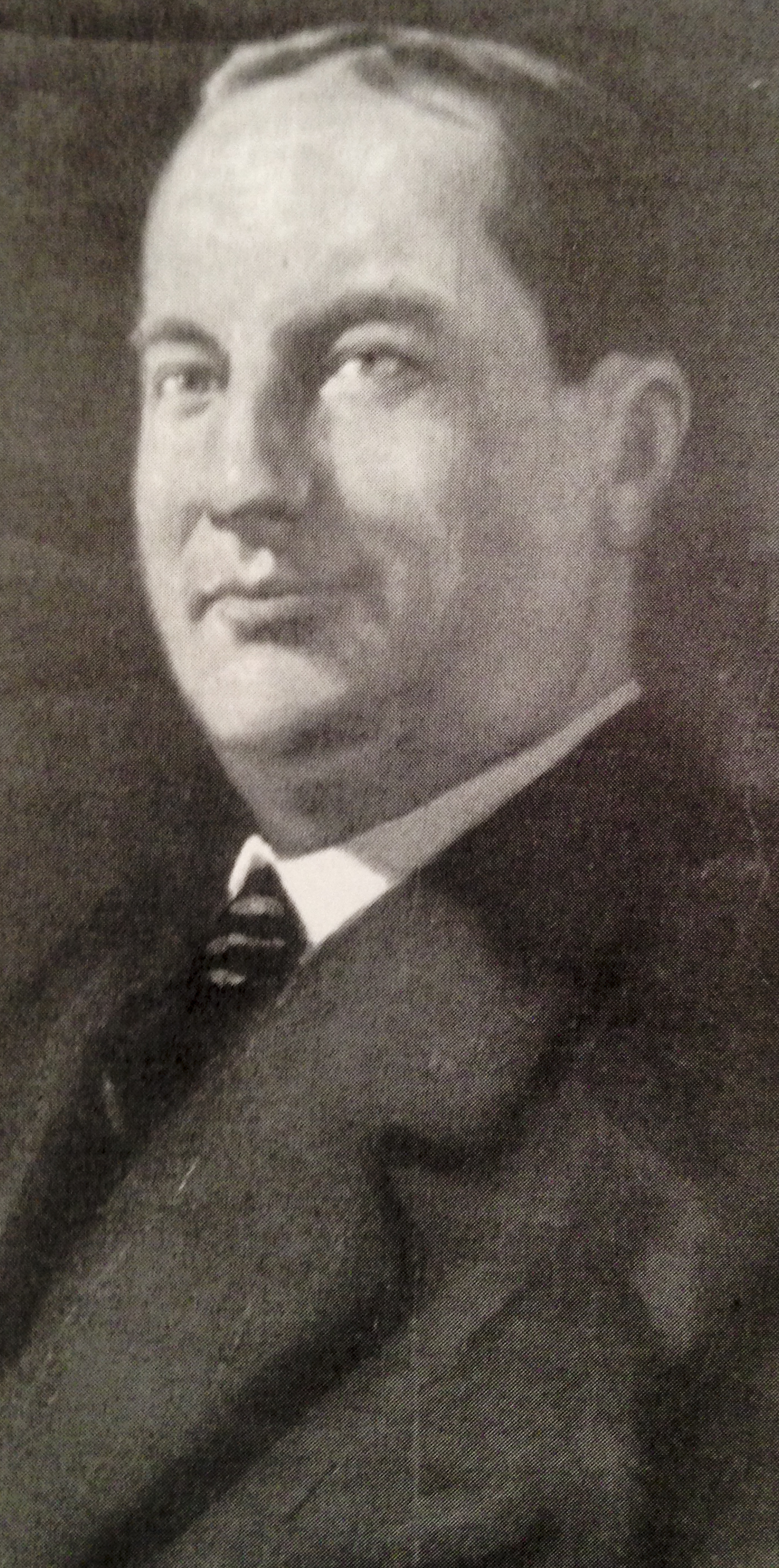
- A portrait of Braden
- Born: March 24, 1871; Indianapolis, Indiana
- Died: 1942 (aged 70–71); California, U.S.
- Occupation: Engineer

William Braden Burford (March 24, 1871 – 1942) was an American engineer and businessman known for his mining enterprises in Chile, earning him the nickname "The Copper King" (Spanish: El Rey del Cobre) in that country.

Between 1893 and 1898, he was an agent for the Omaha and Grant Foundry and Refining Company, which sent him to Chile in 1894. There, he met Italian engineer Marco Chiapponi, who urged him to seek partners for the industrial extraction of the El Teniente mine. Thus, in partnership with his compatriot Barton Sewell, he established the copper company Braden Copper Company in 1904. In 1909, Braden sold on the copper company to the Guggenheim brothers, Simon and Daniel, remaining as the company's director.

In 1913, he began exploiting the Potrerillos mine, which he purchased from Chileans Zamorano and Echevarría, creating Andes Copper Mining. Later, in 1916, he sold the mine to the Anaconda Copper Company. In 1918, he left Chile.

Braden prospected the area near the future copper mine of Los Pelambres in 1914 but he did never discover the deposits. In the 1960s the ore deposit was discovered thanks to rock samples brought to the valley town of Illapel by an arriero. One of the largest copper deposits in the world, production in 2016 was forecasted at 355–365,000 tonnes of copper, 45–55,000 ounces of gold and 8.0–9.0 tonnes of molybdenum.

== Bibliography ==
- Millán, Augusto (1996). Evaluación y factibilidad de proyectos mineros (in Spanish). Editorial Universitaria. ISBN 956-11-1241-8.
