= Los Pelambres Airport =

Los Pelambres Airport Aeropuerto Los Pelambres
- IATA: none; ICAO: SCNK

Summary
- Airport type: Public
- Serves: Salamanca, Chile
- Elevation AMSL: 4,003 ft / 1,220 m
- Coordinates: 31°52′15″S 70°37′03″W

Map
- Location of Los Pelambres Airport in Chile

Runways
Direction	Length		Surface
Direction	m	ft	Surface
02/20	900	2,953	Asphalt
- Sources: Landings.com Google Maps GCM

Los Pelambres Airport (Spanish: Aeropuerto Los Pelambres, (ICAO: SCNK)) is an airport serving the town of Salamanca and the Los Pelambres copper mine in the Coquimbo Region of Chile.

The airport is 35 kilometres (22 mi) east of the town, which is in the narrow Choapa River valley. The mine and runway are in an adjoining valley running north from the river. There is mountainous terrain in all quadrants.

== See also ==
- Transport in Chile
- List of airports in Chile
