= Ministro Hales mine =

Copper mine in Chile

Ministro Hales
- Location within Antofagasta Region Location within Chile
- Location: Antofagasta Region, Chile; 22°22′54.56″S 68°54′44.52″W
- Products: Copper
- Production: ▼122,200 tons of copper
- Financial year: 2024
- Opened: 2013
- Company: Codelco

Ministro Hales, formerly known as Mansa Mina, (Note: "Mansa Mina" is regarded as a slightly impolite name given that it in Chilean Spanish can mean either "huge mine" or "what a babe".) is an open-pit copper mine in the Atacama Desert of northern Chile. It lies at an altitude of 2,600 meters above sea level in an area of cold desert climate in the inland commune of Calama. The mine is located halfway between the city of Calama and the mine of Chuquicamata. Codelco owns and operates the mine. Ground work in the mine begun in 2011 with a large-scale pre-stripping operation. In 2024 Codelco planned to extend the mine life for several decades with the closure phase beginning in 2055 and ending in 2061.

In January 2021 the eastern wall –that is the footwall– of the pit begun to be tracked for its stability and in early November 2021 its creep accelerated culminating in a collapse and slandslide on November 9, 2021. There were no deaths, injuries or major equipment losses.

In 2024 it produced 122,200 tons of copper down from 126,000 tons in 2023 and 152,200 tons in 2022. As of 2024 Ministro Hales was the 14th most productive copper mine in Chile. It is named after Alejandro Hales (1923–2001) who served as the Minister of Mining from September 1992 to March 1994.
