= Salin Formation =

Geological formation in northern Chile

- Stratigraphic range: Miocene-Pliocene
- Type: Geological formation
- Unit of: Salar de Atacama basin
- Thickness: c. 200 m

Lithology
- Primary: Volcaniclastic sand, silt and gravel
- Other: Volcanic ash, evaporite

Location
- Coordinates: 24°1′51.70″S 68°11′44.79″W
- Region: Antofagasta Region
- Country: Chile
- Salin Formation (Chile)

Salin Formation (Spanish: Formación Salin) is a geological formation composed of alternations of volcanic sand, silt and gravel in inland Antofagasta Region, northern Chile. The formation is poorly consolidated and include layers of volcanic ash and evaporite as well as lacustrine sediments. The formation is overlaid by a permeable ignimbrite. Based on geochemical similarities Socompa volcano may be the source for the upper units of the formation. The formation is the main water-bearing geological unit of the Monturaqui-Negrillar-Tilopozo Aquifer. The formation has been estimated to have medium to high permeability.
