= Los Pelambres =

Copper mine in Salamanca, Chile

Los Pelambres mine
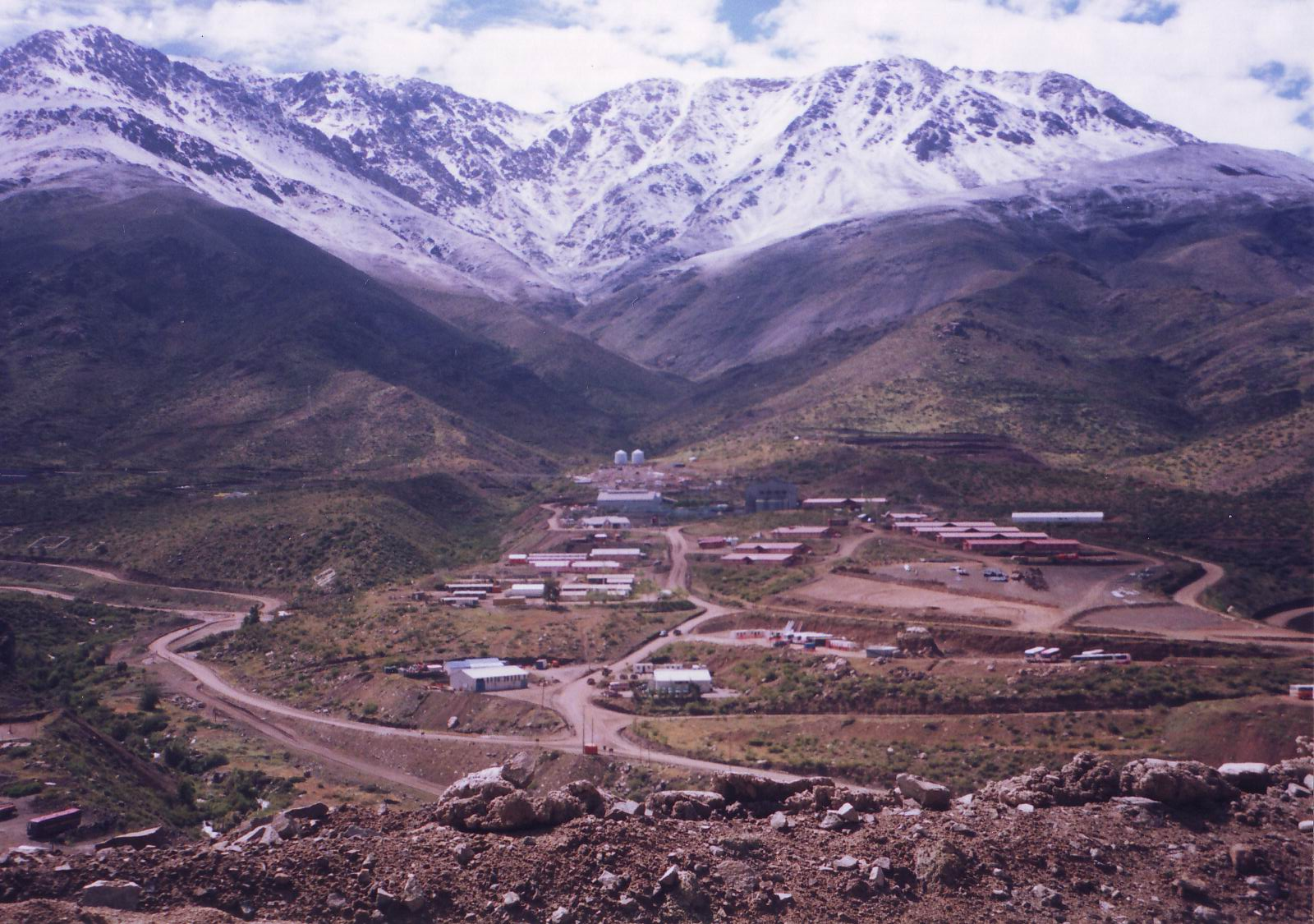

- Location within Coquimbo Region Location within Chile
- Location: Coquimbo Region, Chile; 31.716691°S 70.490446°W
- Products: Copper
- Opened: 1990
- Company: Antofagasta Minerals

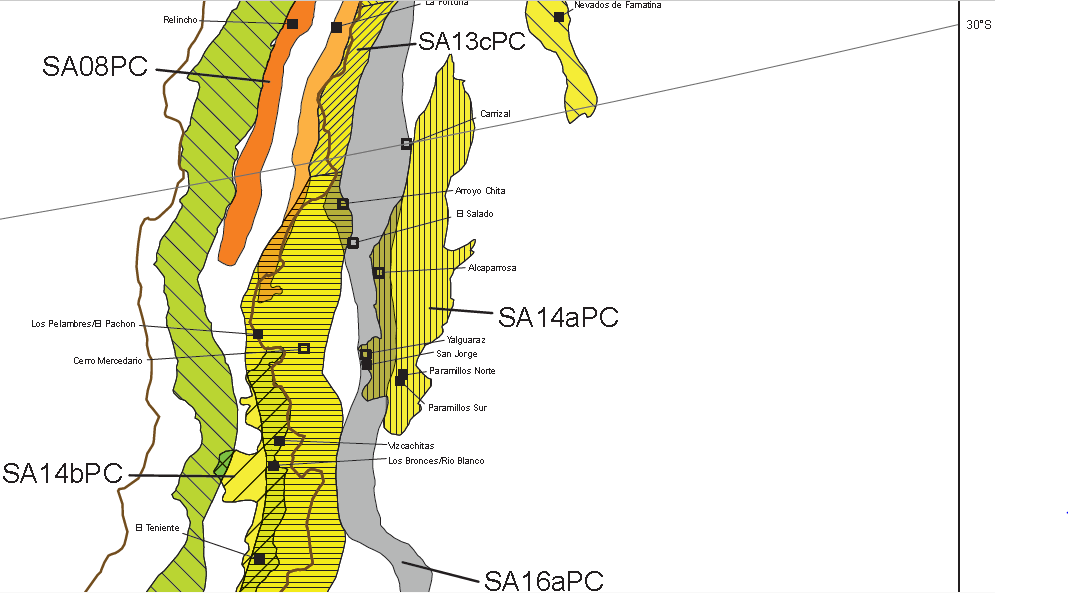
Location of the Los Pelambres and El Teniente copper mines in Chile

Los Pelambres mine is a copper mine located in the north-central of Chile in Coquimbo Region. It is one of the largest copper reserves in the world, having estimated reserves of 4.9 billion tonnes of ore grading 0.65% copper.

Production in 2024 was 320,000 tonnes of copper and 46,600 ounces of gold. The mine is served by Los Pelambres Airport, and by a water desalination facility at Los Vilos. A billion-dollar expansion project was completed in 2024.

William Braden prospected the area near the future mine in 1914 but did not locate the deposits. In the 1960s the ore deposit was discovered thanks to rock samples brought to the valley town of Illapel by an arriero.

== Geology ==
The Upper Miocene tonalite stock is a north–south oriented oval, 4.5 by 2.4 km in size, which has undergone hydrothermal alteration. The stock intruded into andesitic host rocks. Glaciation during the Pleistocene carved the U-shaped Los Pelambres valley. The head of the valley has the highest concentration of ore in a roche moutonnee. A core of potassium silicate alteration contains the economic copper-molybdenum mineralization. Sulfide minerals include chalcopyrite, bornite, pyrite and molybdenite.

== See also ==
- Chuquicamata
- El Teniente
- Escondida

== Bibliography ==
- Millán, Augusto (1996). Evaluación y factibilidad de proyectos mineros (in Spanish). Editorial Universitaria. ISBN 956-11-1241-8.
