= Braden Copper Company =

American company (1904–1967)

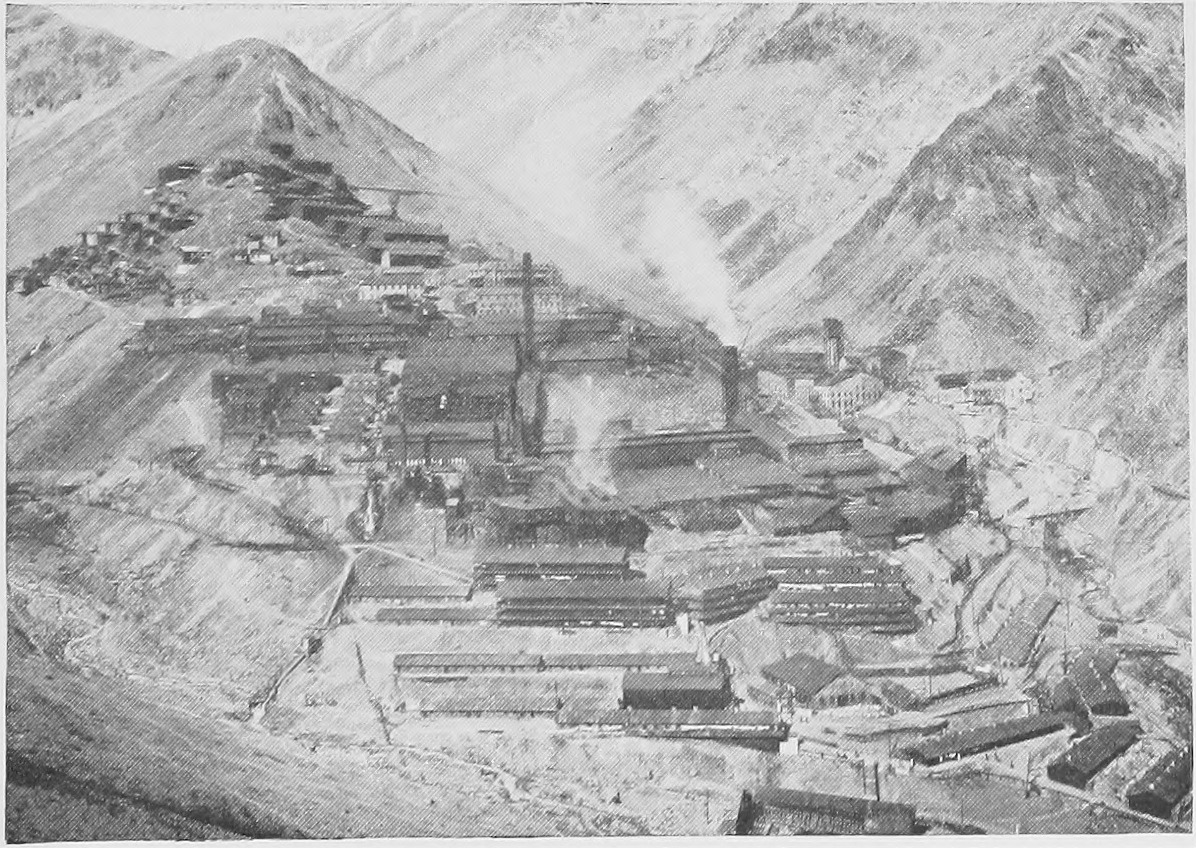
- Sewell Camp at Night (image from Chile today and tomorrow)
- Company type: Private
- Industry: Mining
- Founded: 1904
- Defunct: 1967
- Fate: Nationalized by Chilean government
- Headquarters: New York City, New York, U.S.
- Key people: Barton Sewell, William Braden
- Products: Copper
- Parent: Kennecott Corporation

Braden Copper Company was an American company that controlled the El Teniente copper mine in Chile until 1967 when its copper holdings were nationalized.

== History ==
Braden Copper Company was founded on 18 June 1904 by E.W. Nash, Barton Sewell, William Braden and other mining partners. Braden visited the mine during the winter of 1903-1904. Using capital of $625,000, the company purchased the mine and developed a mill at Sewell, Chile. Production started on 1 June 1906. Barton Sewell never visited Chile and was limited to participating in the business as an upper executive at the companies central offices in New York City.

After E.W. Nash died in 1905, Braden turned to John Hays Hammond and Guggenex, owned by the Guggenheim brothers, for financing. Braden Mines Company was formed on 10 July 1909. In June 1910, the Guggenheims took control of the mine and provided financing which turned the oxcart road into a railway, built a three-thousand ton mill and hydroelectric plants. Kennecott Copper Corporation acquired 99 percent of Braden Copper Mines Company in 1915.

In 1935, the Braden Copper Company signed the World Copper Agreement along with the rest of the world's principle mining companies. In 1945, the company constructed the Braden Copper Stadium in the city of Rancagua, now called Estadio El Teniente. This stadium would be seat of the 1962 FIFA World Cup.

In accordance with the Chilean nationalization of copper, by 1967 the Chilean government had acquired 51 percent of the stock in the Braden Copper Company. By 1971, the company was completely nationalized.

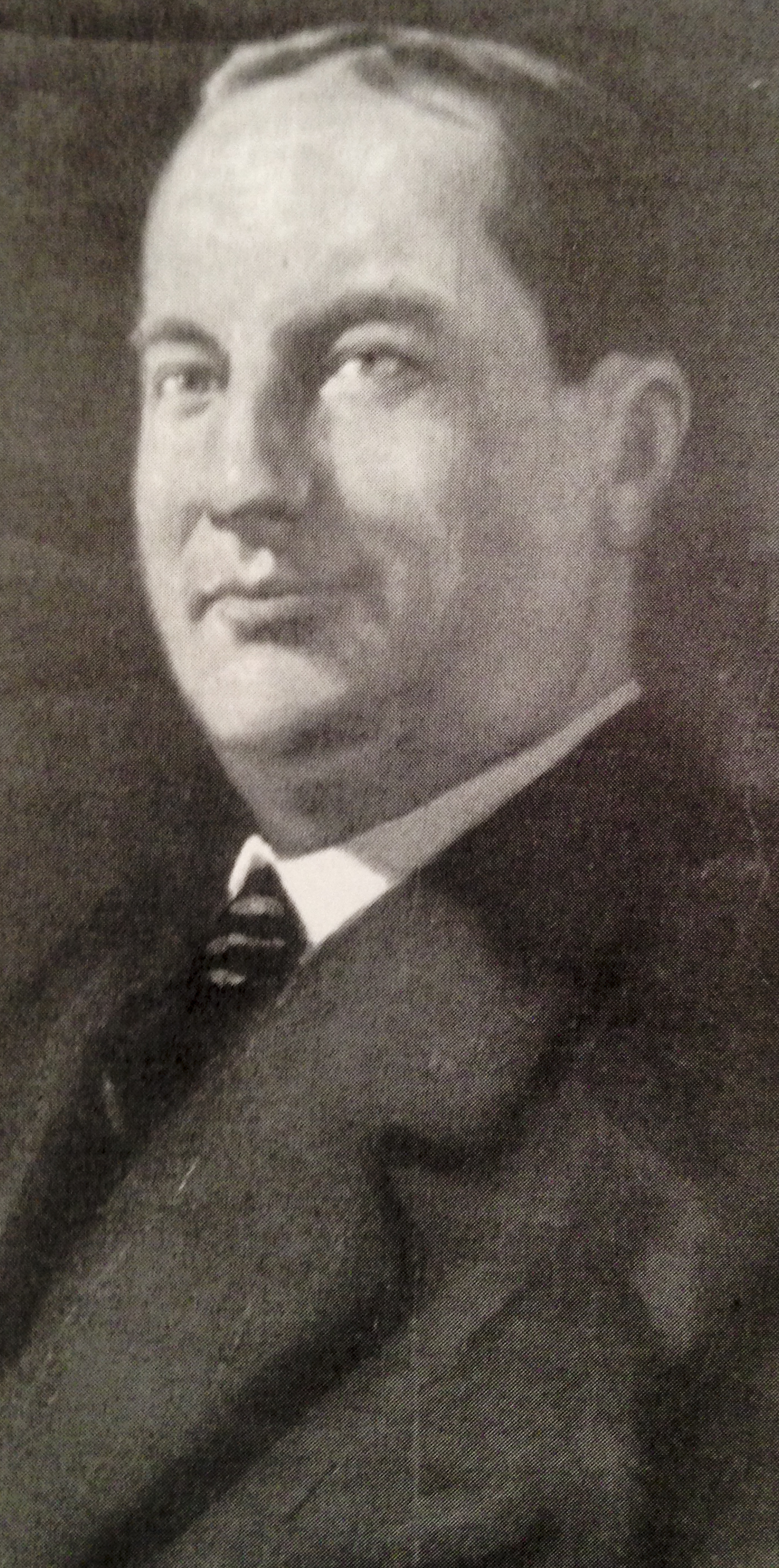
William Braden

Mineral de Cobre
"El Teniente"

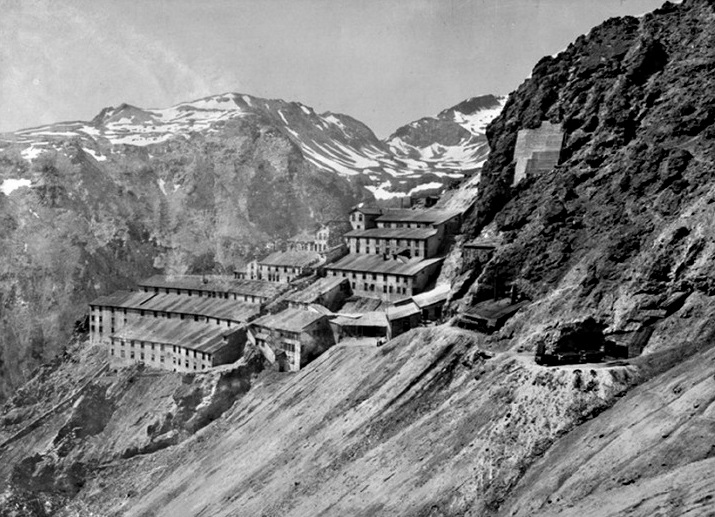
El Teniente (before 1922)

== See also ==
- Smoke tragedy
