= Monturaqui-Negrillar-Tilopozo Aquifer =

Aquifer in Antofagasta Region, Chile

Coordinates: 24°27′41.99″S 68°52′9.71″W

The Monturaqui-Negrillar-Tilopozo Aquifer is an aquifer in the commune of San Pedro de Atacama in inland Antofagasta Region, Chile. The aquifer lies in the Atacama Desert straddling Puna de Atacama plateau on the western side of the Andes. The aquifer discharges naturally in Salar de Atacama allowing for the meadows of Tilopozo (Spanish: Vegas de Tilopozo) to exist at the southern fringes of the salt flat.

The aquifer lies in a 60 km long north–south trending depression runs south from Salar de Atacama filled with permeable volcanic rocks of the Salin Formation. The flow and composition of its waters are influenced by the El Negrillar volcanic field, which lies in the middle of the groundwater body and separates it into two halves.

The aquifer has for decades been tapped for water by mining companies. The copper mine of Escondida supplied itself with freshwater from 1998 to 2019 from a well field in the aquifer located 78 km east of the mine. This well field had an installed capacity to extract 1400 liters per second. (Note: At present Escondida is supplied with water from a desalination plant near Caleta Coloso in the coast.)

== Illegal water extraction lawsuit ==
In 2022 the mining industry's use of the aquifer's water was legally challenged by indigenous Atacameño communities (Note: These were Comunidad Indígena Atacameña de Peine with the support of Consejo de Pueblos Atacameños.) due to purported environmental harm. The legal case was joined by a lawsuit by Consejo de Defensa del Estado (CDE) against Minera Escondida, Minera Zaldívar SpA and Albemarle Limitada. (Note: Minera Escondida which operates Escondida, Chile's largest copper mine. Minera Zaldívar Spa which operates the copper mine of Zaldívar and Albemarle Limitada extracts lithium from Salar de Atacama. Minera Escondida is majority owned by BHP and Minera Zaldívar Spa owned by Antofagasta Minerals and Barrick Mining.) These companies were charged with illegal extraction of water, leading among other things to groundwater level to drop in the Tilopozo area more than 25 cm allowed by previous extraction permits.

In its defense Albemarle Limitada have asserted that its extracts only surface water from a spring and that its use is minimal (0.5% of the historic water uptake) compared to the other companies. Minera Escondida for its part argued that any effects of its water extraction have not had time to manifest at the meadows of Tilopozo, due to the slow movement of groundwater, and hence that it was the extraction of the other two companies that had impacted it.

A series of settlements and compensatory measure at the First Environmental Court of Antofagasta ended the case in late 2024. In a December 2024 conciliation agreement the three companies were to compensate economically, socially and environmentally the indigenous Comunidad de Peine as well as paying for damages to the meadows of Tilopozo and the lakes of La Punta and La Brava.

Zaldívar avoided premature mine closure in May 2025 when Chile's Environmental Evaluation Service extended its continental water use rights until 2028.

Environmental damages related to water extraction from the aquifer include the loss of recharge capacity and diminished biodiversity on surface. Full natural regeneration from these damages is estimated to happen no earlier than year 2200. The groundwater-dependent meadows of Tilopozo had consistently shrunk in area and vigour since 2007. It has also been argued that groundwater extraction risked the extinction of the caracol de Tilopozo, an endemic snail species.
