= 2025 El Teniente mining accident =

Mining disaster in Chile

A localized collapse in the El Teniente mine of Codelco occurred on the afternoon of July 31, 2025, when an earthquake with a magnitude of magnitude 4.2 according to both the National Seismological Center of Chile and the United States Geological Survey caused a collapse inside the mine, leaving six workers dead and nine injured, being the most serious accident at the mine in recent years.

According to data from the National Geology and Mining Service (Sernageomin) and the National Seismological Center, on July 31, 2025, "at 17:34 hours, an earthquake of magnitude 4.2 (R) was recorded, located 37 km northeast of Rancagua, causing a collapse inside the "Andesita" mine belonging to the "El Teniente" Division, in the municipality of Machalí." The seismic movement that caused the collapse occurred approximately 400 or 500 meters from the Andesita sector.

A large scale rescue operation involving over 100 personnel, including experts from the 2010 Copiapó rescue, was launched. On 2 August 2025, the final body was found bringing the death toll to six, the regional prosecutor said the focus would now be on a criminal investigation in to the incident.

At 5:51 p.m. on August 3, the president of Chile, Gabriel Boric, decreed national mourning for the death of the six miners in the collapse.

== Background ==
El Teniente mine lies in the Andes of O'Higgins Region in Central Chile. It lies in the commune of Machalí, about 28 km east of the regional capital of Rancagua. It is Chile's third most productive copper mine with Chile being the world's top producer of copper. It is also considered the world's largest underground copper mine. The mine has been part of the state-owned mining company Codelco since 1976, after it was nationalised in 1971. The tonnage of copper produced in the mine in 2024 was 81% of that of 2005. The decrease has been traced to geomechanical problems compromising the stability of the mine. Other large Codelco mines have faced similar long-term declines of productivity and geomechanical issues.

In the early 2020s several mine expansion projects were started in El Teniente with the aim to replace productive areas of the mine that were depleted and thus extend the mine lifetime with 50 years. These projects seek a gradual deepening of the mine and have total investment costs of US$ 3.200 million. For 2023 there were plans for mining in Nuevo Nivel Mina ("New Mine Level") in three areas around the same time: in the Diamante area at 2,060 m asl, the Andesita area at 2,030 m asl, and Andes Norte at 1,880 m asl.
