= Chuquisaca =

Chuquisaca (Quechua: Chuqichaka; Aymara: Chuqisaka) is the indigenous name of Sucre, the constitutional capital of Bolivia. It may also refer to:

- Chuquisaca Department
- Chuquisaca Revolution, a popular uprising on 25 May 1809
- Alliance for Chuquisaca, an electoral alliance in Chuquisaca created in May 2010
