= 2006 Copiapó mining accident =

- Date: January 20, 2006
- Time: 08:30 local time (11:30 UTC)
- Location: Copiapó, Chile
- Deaths: 2
- Injuries: 2

The 2006 Copiapó mining accident occurred on January 20, 2006, when an explosion occurred in the underground Carola-Agustina copper mine in Copiapó, Chile. It was caused by two trucks colliding, and the explosion covered the only escape route for the miners inside the mine.

The explosion caused two deaths and two injuries. Seventy miners were trapped.

Shortly after the explosion occurred, workers at the nearby mine, "Punta de Cobre", began digging a tunnel towards the Carola-Agustina mine to assist in rescuing the trapped miners. Rescue efforts lasted seven hours, and the 70 trapped miners were rescued alive.

== See also ==
- 1964 Andacollo mining accident
- 2010 Copiapó mining accident
