= Zaldívar mine =

Mine in Antofagasta Region, Chile

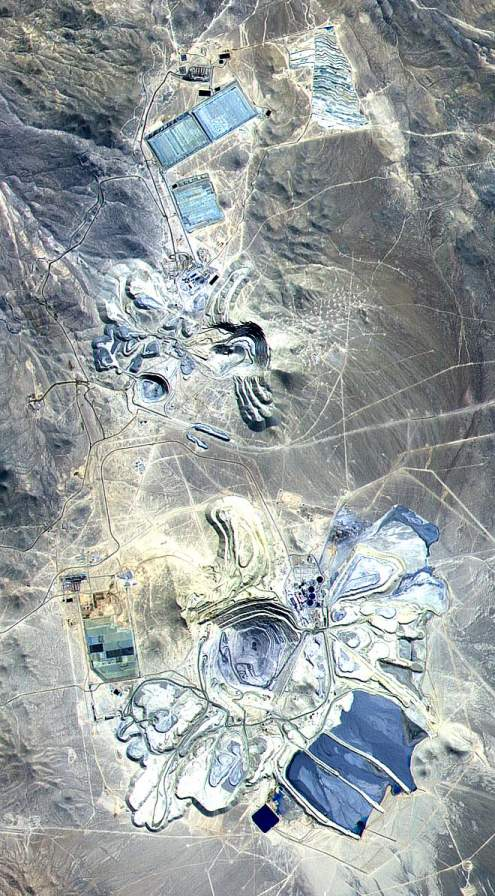
- False color satellite image of Zaldívar mine (top) and neighbourin Escondida (bottom), April 2000

- Location within Antofagasta Region Location within Chile
- Location: Commune of Antofagasta, Antofagasta Region, Chile; 24°12′10.97″S 69°4′1.96″W
- Products: Copper
- Production: ▲82.8 kTon
- Financial year: 2024
- Opened: 1995
- Company: Minera Zaldívar: Antofagasta Minerals (50%); Barrick Mining (50%)

The Zaldívar mine is an open pit copper mine located in the Atacama Desert of northern Chile. More precisely it lies in the inland portion of the commune of Antofagasta in the Antofagasta Region. The mine started production in 1995, about five years after the neighbouring giant copper mine Escondida. Mining in Zaldívar peaked from 1998 to 2012 when the mine produced each year, except 2005, between 130 and 151 KTon copper. Then, from 2020 onward production in Zaldívar mine has been consistently under 100 kTon copper but never below 80 kTon. In December 2015 Antofagasta Minerals purchased 50% of the shares from Barrick Gold and thus took full control of the operation. Previously, the mine was fully owned by Placer Dome.

In 2023 it produced 40,500 tonnes copper cathode. As of 2023 it employed on average 3,102 workers, including contractors.

Starting in 2022 the mine's usage of the Monturaqui-Negrillar-Tilopozo aquifer has been challenged by indigenous Atacameño communities. According to BNamericas premature mine closure was avoided in May 2025 when Chile's Environmental Assessment Service extended continental water use rights until 2028.

Minera Zaldívar which operates the mine holds The Copper Mark environmental certificate.
