= 1964 Andacollo mining accident =

Chile mining accident

- Date: 19 February 1964
- Location: Pique Flore de Te & Pique G3, near Andacollo, Coquimbo Region, Chile; 30.250181°S 71.093953°W
- Outcome: All 7 trapped miners rescued
- Andacollo (Chile)

The 1964 Andacollo mining accident began on 19 February 1964, with a cave-in at a gallery of an improvised small-scale gold mine, located in the vicinity of the town of Andacollo, 39 kilometers southeast of the regional capital of La Serena, in north-central Chile. In the accident seven pirquineros were trapped a for days while ENAMI led an ultimately successful rescue. Two miners were rescued on the third day of entrapment and the remaining five in the seventh day. The event generated an intense news coverage via radio and the press in Chile.

Later in 1975 ENAMI started to buy much of the property where small-scale mines existed around Andacollo and the large-scale Carmen de Andacollo copper-gold mine begun operations in 1994.

== Bibliography ==
- Danús, Hernán (2007). "V. La geología y las exploraciones mineras". Crónicas mineras de medio siglo (1950-2000) (in Spanish). Santiago de Chile: RIL Editores. ISBN 978-956-284-555-7.
