= 1945 El Teniente mining accident =

Mining disaster in Chile

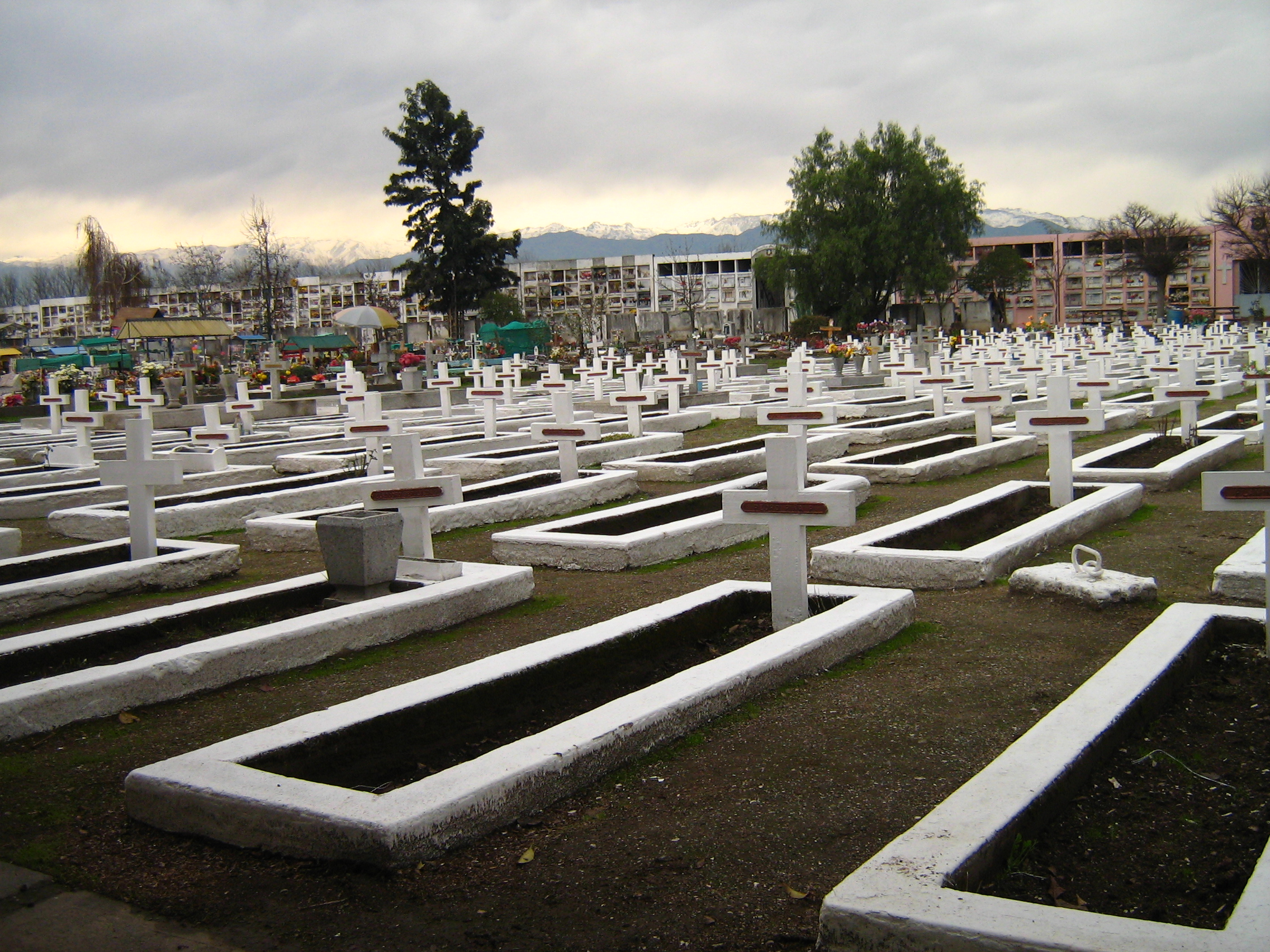
Tombs of 355 workers who died in June 1945 at El Teniente, cemetery in Rancagua

The 1945 El Teniente mining accident, known locally as the Smoke Tragedy (Spanish: La tragedía del humo), is the largest mining accident in metal extraction in the history of Chile and, as of 2005, worldwide. It happened on June 19, 1945, in Chile's El Teniente mine in the Andes, which belonged to Braden Copper Company, a subsidiary of Kennecott Copper Corporation, both of the United States. A total of 355 men died, largely because of a nearby fire whose smoke trapped the workers in tunnels and resulted in carbon monoxide poisoning. Another 747 men were injured by the smoke.

== Description ==
Nearly 1,000 workers were underground in the pits on June 19, 1945, when a fire started at a nearby warehouse near "Teniente C" pike. It spread to oil drums and burned fiercely. Thick smoke was drawn into the pike and spread through the tunnels of the mine. The ventilation systems did not work adequately, and the smoke obscured the exits. Men near the pike were able to escape, but most of the others sought refuge in security corridors or at the bottom of the pikes. Emergency exits were improperly marked, hindering the escape of many until too late. Men began to succumb to carbon monoxide poisoning because of the smoke, which left them unconscious. Some 355 miners died; another 747 were injured.

Although the external fire was brought under control by that evening, rescue workers could not enter the tunnels until noon the next day. Rescuers spent 3 days trying to free the miners, but found hundreds already dead.

A mass was celebrated for the miners at the nearby camp in Sewell on June 20. The government declared three days of mourning, and businesses and schools closed in response to the national tragedy. Flags throughout the country were flown at half mast. The Mining Superintendent issued a report on the accident in the months afterward.

== Legacy ==
As there was no cemetery at Sewell, the company town on the mountain, all of the miners' bodies were taken to Rancagua in the valley for burial. In addition to compensating the families of the workers financially, Kennecott developed a community here, known as Las Viudas Population (The Widows Community), to provide housing for the many widows and their families. The workers were buried in graves marked by gravestones of the same design. (See image).

The disaster resulted in the adoption in Chile of occupational safety systems already in use in the US and Europe. In addition, the Congress of Chile passed legislation to reduce the independence of the company, and the Work Accident Law to support worker safety. The government established the Department of Mining Safety, stressing more communication with miners. El Teniente made such improvements to its operation that the mine won the international security award for 14 consecutive years.
