= El Teniente =

Mine in Sewell, Cachapoal, Chile

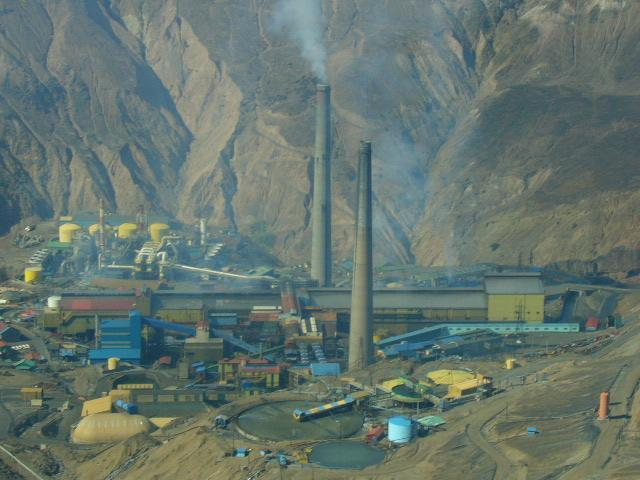
- Caletones copper smelter at El Teniente

- Location within Chile
- Location: Sewell, Cachopoal, Chile; 34°05′16″S 70°23′15″W
- Products: Copper
- Type: Underground
- Opened: 1819
- Company: Codelco

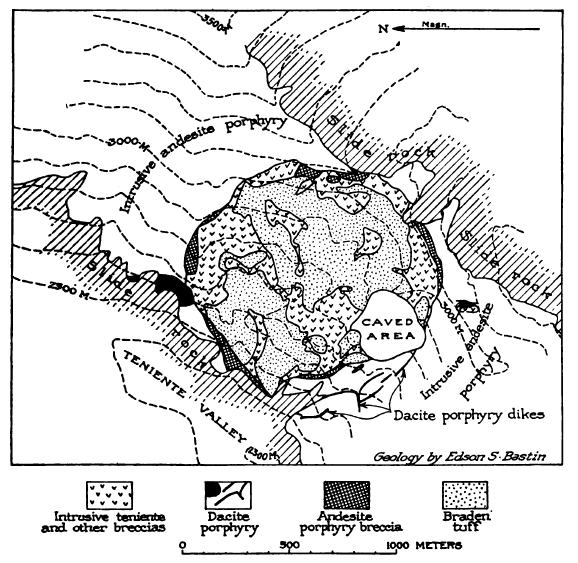
Geological map of the Braden Mine

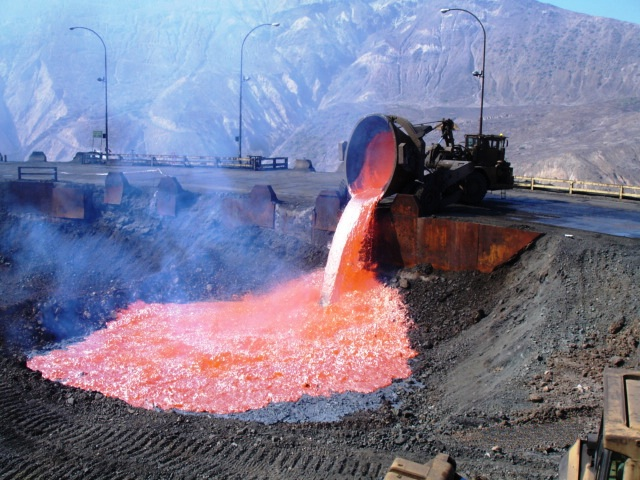
Pouring slag from Caletones onto the dump, El Teniente

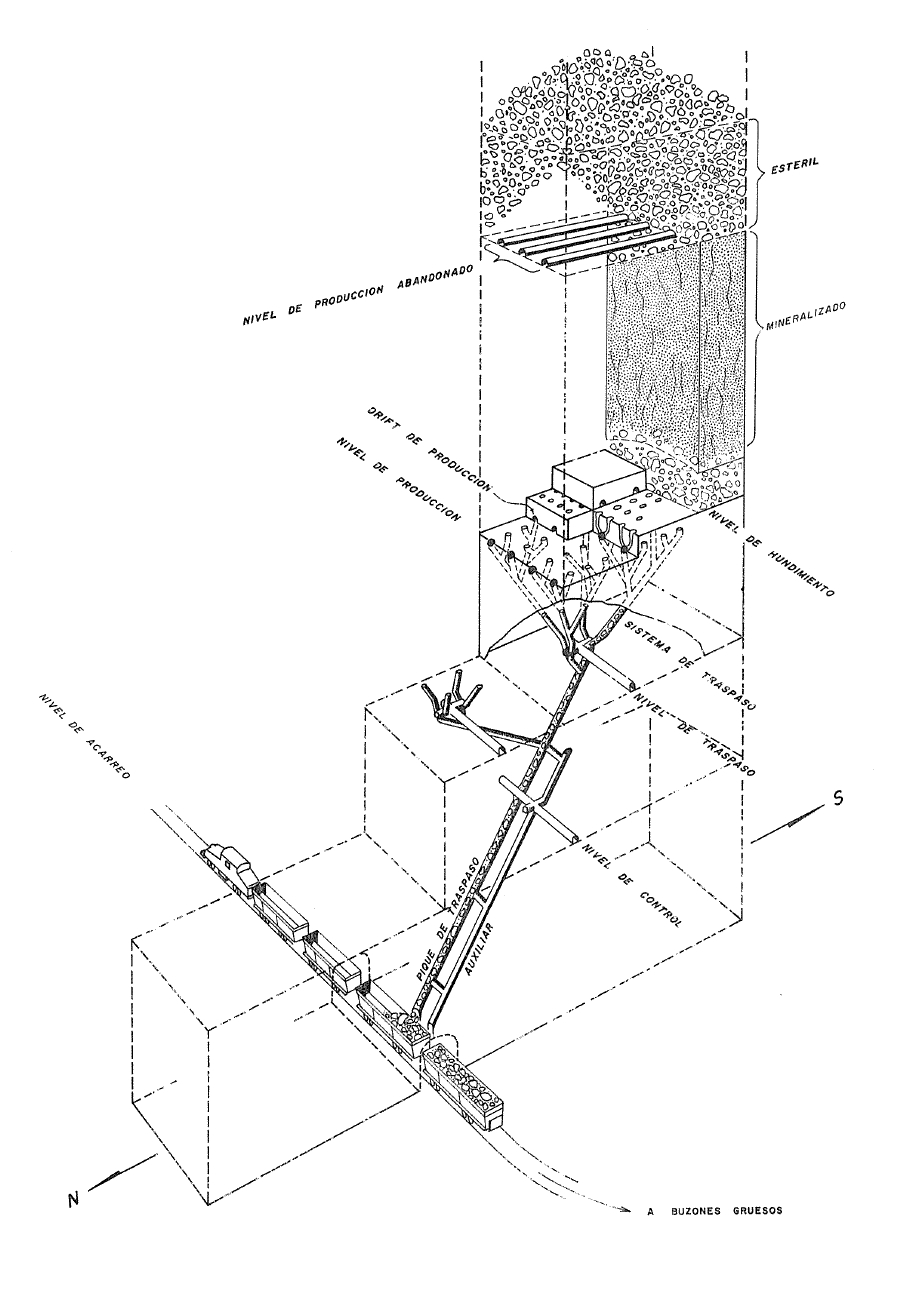
"The ore is mined by a highly developed caving system and carried down to the main transportation level through an elaborate system of ore passes."

El Teniente (Spanish for "The Lieutenant") is the world's largest underground copper mine, located in the Andes Mountains of central Chile at an elevation of 2,300 metres (7,500 ft) above sea level. It is operated by the state-owned mining company Codelco and constitutes the largest division of its operations. Mining at the site dates back to at least 1819, but large-scale industrial extraction began in 1906 under U.S. ownership, initially through the Braden Copper Company and later Kennecott Copper Corporation. In 1971, during the presidency of Salvador Allende, Chile nationalized its copper industry and acquired full ownership of El Teniente. The mine contains more than 3,000 kilometres (1,900 mi) of tunnels and employs about five thousand workers. It was the site of the 1945 Smoke Tragedy, the deadliest metal mining accident in Chilean and world history. Since 2011, El Teniente has been undergoing a major expansion known as the New Mine Level project, which aims to extend operations deeper into the mountain without halting production. As of 2023 it is the third most productive copper mine in Chile after Los Pelambres and Escondida.

== History ==
According to legend, the El Teniente mine was discovered in the 1800s by a fugitive Spanish official. Exploitation of the resource began in 1819. The best ore was mined manually in what would be called the Fortuna sector, and transported out of the mine by pack animals, such as ponies and mules. It was worked until 1897, when the high-grade ore was exhausted.

In 1904 William Braden (an engineer from New York City, United States) and E.W. Nash formed the Braden Copper Company. They built a road for carts and a concentrating plant, which was in operation by 1906.

In June 1910, Guggenheim Exploration took control of the mine and provided financing. In 1916 Braden became a subsidiary company of Kennecott Copper Corporation, which was based in Utah.

Chileans have referred to such large-scale copper mining operations as La Gran Minería del Cobre (a major copper mine). Before nationalization, these operations generated a large proportion of the foreign currency which the country received.

In 1945 there was a disaster at El Teniente mine, resulting in the deaths of 355 men and injury to 747 more. It was the largest mining accident in Chilean and has the highest death toll in world history associated with metal extraction. Some 1,000 miners were down in the pits when the fire started in a nearby warehouse. Dense smoke spread in the underground tunnels. Most of the dead and injured suffered carbon monoxide poisoning. Emergency exits were not well marked. In Chile, this incident is known locally as the Smoke Tragedy (Spanish: La tragedía del humo).

In 1967 the Chilean government bought a 51% stake in the mine and founded Sociedad Minería El Teniente. Under this agreement Kennecott built a new concentrator, and the mine expanded production to 63,000 t (69,000 short tons) per day.

On July 11, 1971, President Salvador Allende ordered the Chilean nationalization of copper, in an effort for the country to gain more benefit from the mines. Corporación Nacional del Cobre de Chile (known as Codelco) was formed, and El Teniente became a state-owned operation. The Chilean government paid Kennecott $92.9-million for the property.

The mine increased production to 100,000 t (110,000 short tons) of ore per day, and in 2006 the mine produced over 418,000 t (461,000 short tons) of copper.

The Canadian company Amerigo produces both a copper and molybdenum concentrate from El Teniente's tailings. It has been granted the right also to treat higher grade tailings from a large, abandoned tailings impoundment near the El Teniente property.

On 31 July 2025, a magnitude 4.2 earthquake, following a seismic tremor, caused a collapse at the mine. A large scale rescue operation involving over 100 personnel, including experts from the 2010 Copiapó rescue, was launched. On 2 August 2025, the final body was found bringing the death toll to 6, the regional prosecutor said the focus would now be on a criminal investigation in to the incident.

== Geology ==
The copper ore deposits are those of a typical copper porphyry and associated alteration-mineralization. These altered zones include chalcopyrite, pyrite, bornite and molybdenite as hypogene minerals and chalcocite as a supergene mineral. The ore body surrounds the Braden Pipe in a continuous ring with a width of 610 metres (2,000 ft). The pipe is a geologic structure in the shape of an inverted cone, having a surface diameter of 1,200 metres (3,900 ft), and consisting of post-pipe breccia called the Braden Formation. The boundary of the pipe is marked by this post-pipe breccia and a pre-pipe breccia forming a belt up to 61 metres (200 ft) wide. "The Braden Pipe was a center of strong mineralization and structural weakness before the pipe was formed." Copper mineralization and pipe formation occurred in the Pliocene. Ore was originally mined from the Fortuna orebody at the southwest quadrant starting in 1906. Since 1922, the larger Teniente orebody has also been mined on the east side. "The best grade of ore is found in altered andesite or in andesitic flow breccia adjacent to the pre-pipe breccia."

Mineralization at El Teniente is thought to be indebted to its position at the intersection of two large fault systems. This favoured the rise of magma and the subsequent circulation of mineral-rich fluids. About 25 km to the southeast of El Teniente, along the mountainous border of Santiago and O'Higgins regions, lies the unexploited porphyry copper deposit of Catedral.

== Labour disruptions ==
As of 2007 Codelco employed 17,000 direct-hire company employees and 28,000 contract employees across all their operations. There have been multiple labour disruptions at the El Teniente mine, where about 5,000 workers produce the ore.

=== 1983 ===
In 1983 El Teniente and two other Codelco mines closed when approximately 13,000 workers voted to strike "indefinitely" in protest of a union leader's arrest for calling for an end to military rule in Chile. In total among the three mines, at least 3,300 workers and 37 labour leaders were fired for participating in the strike.

=== 2008 ===
Contract workers went on strike at Codelco mines in 2008. El Teniente and two other Codelco mines were closed, El Teniente for the shortest length. Company employees continued to work; however, striking workers closed access to the mines and threw stones at buses transporting employees from the mine to the town of Rancagua. At least one employee was injured; he was hit by a metal object thrown by a protester on the highway leading to the mine.
