= ENAMI (Chile) =

Chilean state-owned mining company

Empresa Nacional de Minería
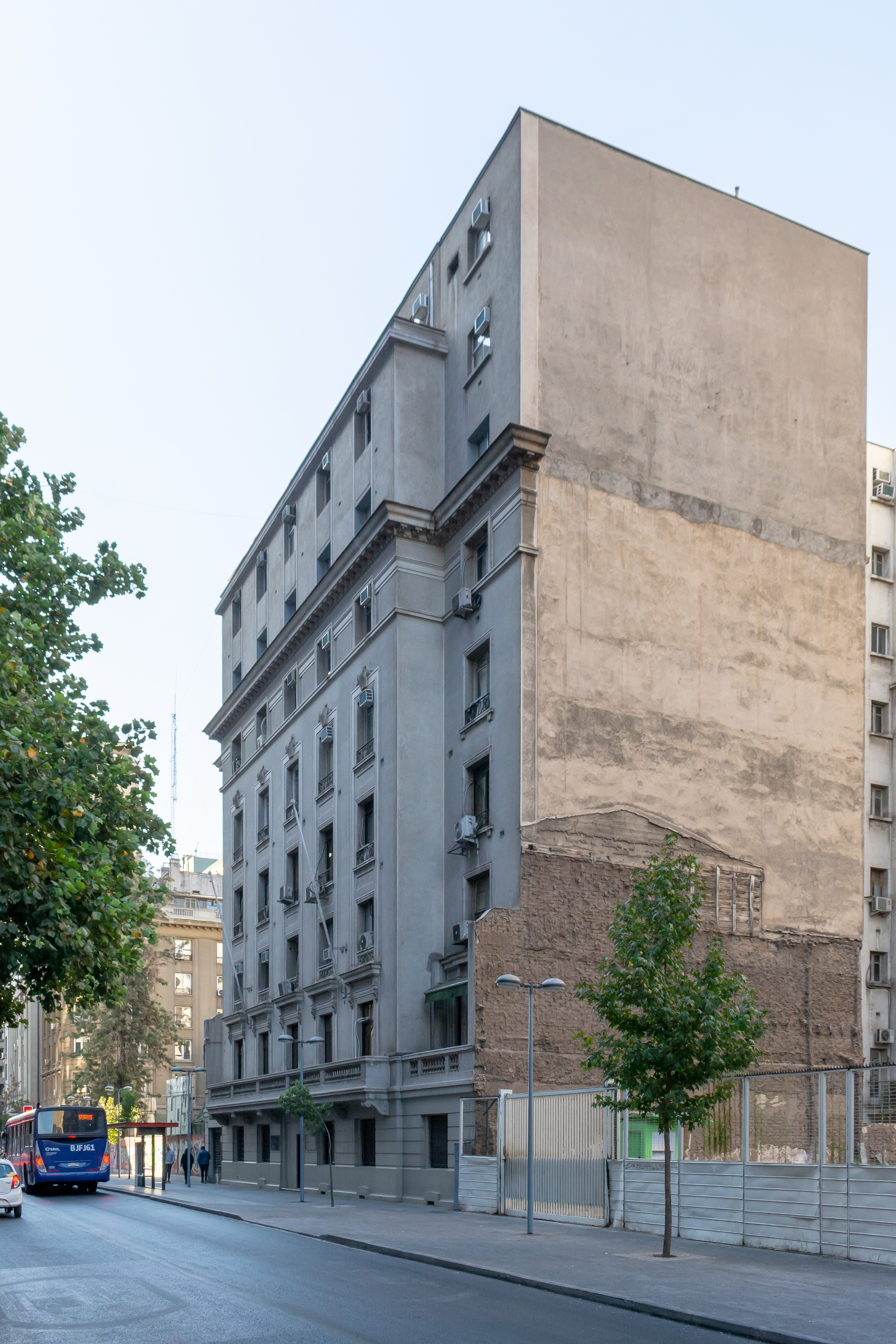
- ENAMI building in Santiago
- Type: Private
- Industry: Mining
- Founded: 1960; 66 years ago
- Founder: Government of Chile
- Headquarters: Santiago, Chile
- Owner: Chilean state
- Number of employees: 1275 (2016)

Empresa Nacional de Minería (National Mining Enterprise) better known by its acronym ENAMI is a Chilean state-owned mining company based in Santiago. Its business involve purchasing ore, primarily from small and medium-scale mining, processing it is and selling the processed product, usually copper, in the international market. ENAMI has also its role in providing technical and financial assistance for mining in its target segment. Its board president is the Chilean minister of mining, who since August 2023 is Aurora Williams. ENAMI was created in 1960 by the merger of Caja de Crédito y Fomento Minero (CACREMI) and Empresa Nacional de Fundiciones. The company is aimed to help small-scale miners by among other things buying ore in quantities that are otherwise too small to be traded in the international market. The company also helps stabilizing prices for the products of medium and small-scale miners. It has most of its offices and smelters and other industries in the northern half och Chile, from Rancagua to the Arica in the far north. South of Rancagua the only office of ENAMI lies in Concepción.

Artisan miners known as pirquineros usually sell their output directly to ENAMI. The number of small-scale miners in charge of a mining operation (each typically having a workforce of five to six miners), including pirquineros, registered at ENAMI has been in the span 2300 to 750 in the 2011–2021 period. Thus, by one estimate in the 2000s to the 2020s in years of high mining activity up to 14,000 miners would have been employed in small-scale mining in Chile. As of 2019 the number of small-scale miners working on copper mining was about twenty times larger than those working on other metals like gold or silver.

ENAMI is considered a key component to fight illegal mining in Chile as it deprives organized crime from taking the role of being the main buyers of the products of small-scale miners as it happens in other Latin American countries.

A reform of the corporate governance of ENAMI was as of December 2025 up for discussion in the mining commission of the Chamber of Deputies of Chile.

Some of the mineral processing of ENAMI is outsourced to Grupo Minero Las Cenizas.

== Assets ==
ENAMI owns 10% of the copper mine Carmen de Andacollo in which Teck Resources owns the remaining 90% of the shares.

In August 2025 ENAMI announced a partnership with Rio Tinto to carry out the lithium brine mining project Salares Altoandinos in Atacama Region.

The underground copper mine of Esperanza near Diego de Almagro is owned by ENAMI. The mine was put on tender for rental or purchase in 2023 and again in 2024.

The porphyry copper prospect of Catedral, 25 km southeast of El Teniente.

=== Smelters and mineral processing plants ===
Planta Delta near the city Ovalle is owned and operated by ENAMI. It processes the ore from the adjacent Panulcillo copper mines and is a point of delivery for other small-scale miners in the region.

The custom copper smelter Fundición Paipote next to Copiapó is owned ENAMI. It has been paralyzed since February 2024 for a major overhaul. At the time of paralyzation the smelter generated economic losses for ENAMI.

ENAMI owns Planta El Salado 20 km away from Esperanza mine in Chañaral Province.

== Former assets ==
In 2024 ENAMI sold its 10% shares in Quebrada Blanca to state-owned Codelco. Prior to this sale Quebrada Blanca was ENAMI's main asset, and the sale was aimed to provide financial capital for the company and pay-off some of ENAMI's debts. The terms of the purchase were criticized by Sociedad Nacional de Minería as lacking transparency. Other critics also point out that shares were sold at prices below what private companies would have paid and that the sale is part of a pattern of empoverishment of ENAMI at the cost of benefitting Codelco.

ENAMI obtained the mine Altamira in southern Antofagasta Region from Codelco in 2005, it was later sold to Minera Pudahuel.

In the 1970s ENAMI owned the mine of El Inglés in the Chilean Coastal Range near Rancagua.

In late 1977 ENAMI sold Los Bronces mine, then known as Disputada, to Exxon for 93 million US$. Exxon later sold the mine to Anglo American plc for 1300 million US$ in 2002.

ENAMI owned the copper smelter Fundición Ventanas in Valparaíso Region from its establishment in 1964 to 2005 when it was sold to Codelco. This smelter closed in 2023 due to environmental issues.

In 1964 ENAMI became the main financier, through loans –and gained the direct ownership of 20%– of a new small mining company that sought to mine copper and gold from Cutter Cove near the Strait of Magellan. ENAMI then gained full ownership of the mine in 1970 but ore extraction that had just begun 1971 halted in 1974 as the mine went at loss. The ore concentrate produced in this period was transported north in ships of the Chilean Navy to the ENAMI smelter of Fundición Ventanas near Valparaíso. The unusually large loans in the 1960s to finance the emerging mining company caused surprise in Sociedad Nacional de Minería.

== Bibliography ==
- Millán, Augusto (1996). Evaluación y factibilidad de proyectos mineros (in Spanish). Editorial Universitaria. ISBN 956-11-1241-8.
- Ulloa Urrutia, Alfie; Contreras Biekert, José Luis; Gana Aravena, Joaquín; Miranda Toledo, Rodrigo; Chauveau Gerber, Paul; Villalobos Valenzuela, Fernando; Farías Soto, Javiera (2017). Productividad en la Gran Minería del Cobre (in Spanish). Comisión Nacional de Productividad. ISBN 978-956-7725-08-3.
