= Limarí River =

River in northern Chile

Coordinates: 30.7294°S 71.6958°W

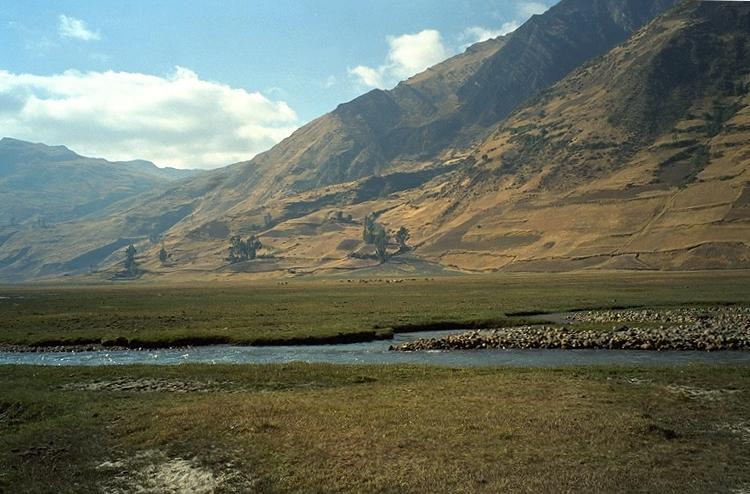

Location
- Country: Chile

Physical characteristics
- Mouth
  - location: Pacific Ocean
- Length: 64 km (40 mi)
- Basin size: 11,800 km^{2} (4,600 sq mi)

Limarí River is a river of Chile located in the Coquimbo Region. The river is formed at the confluence of the Hurtado and Grande rivers, about 4 km east of the city of Ovalle. The lower course of the river borders the southern portion of Bosque de Fray Jorge National Park. This watershed includes presence of the endangered Chilean Wine Palm, Jubaea chilensis, which prehistorically had a much broader distribution, but presently is threatened by the expanding human population in central Chile.

== See also ==
- List of rivers of Chile
