= Iván Espinoza Bardavid =

Info on Iván Espinoza Bardavid

Iván Espinoza Bardavid is a Chilean engineer and politician. He was Provincial Presidential Delegate of the Province of Limarí in the second government of Sebastián Piñera and former Secretary of Government of the Coquimbo Region in the first government of the same president.

== Studies and political career ==
Espinoza holds a degree in electronic engineering from the Catholic University of the North. He also holds three diplomas in Human Resources and Public Management and a master's degree in Higher Education Administration with a mention in University Policies and Planning from the Federal University of Santa Catarina in Brazil.

His political career began in 2010 when he was appointed Regional Ministerial Secretary of Government of the Coquimbo Region in the first government of Sebastián Piñera, a position in which he remained until the end of his term, being one of the six SEREMIS to reach that milestone.

Subsequently, in 2019, he was appointed Governor of the Province of Limarí as a result of the resignation of Darío Molina Sanhueza. Before to his appointment, Espinoza served as Director of Control in the Municipality of Río Hurtado.
