= Limarí =

Limarí may refer to:

- Limarí Province, one of three provinces of the Chilean region of Coquimbo Region
- Limarí River, a river of Chile located in the Coquimbo Region
