= Eramet =

French multinational mining and metallurgy company

Eramet S.A.
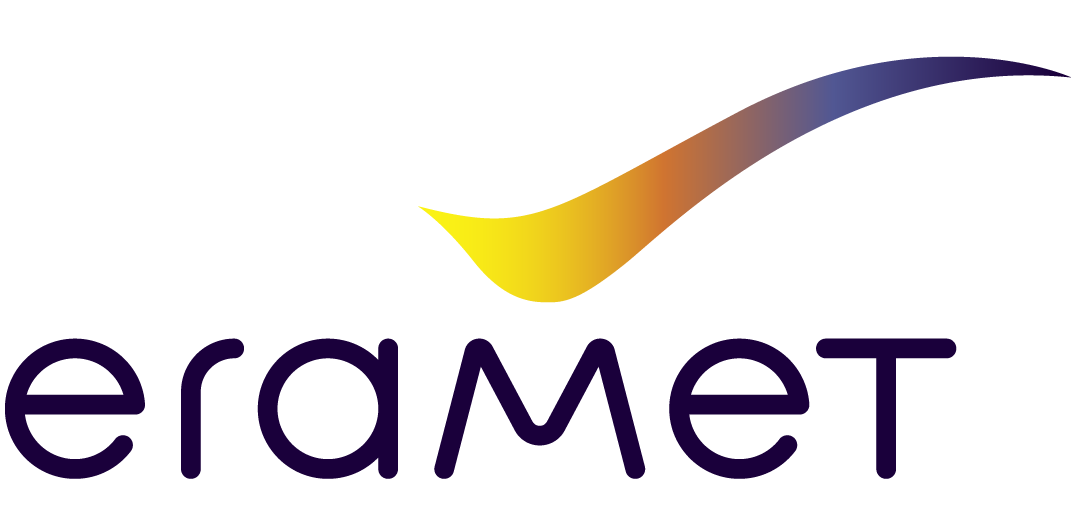
- Company type: Société Anonyme
- Traded as: Euronext Paris: ERA; CAC Mid 60 Component
- ISIN: FR0000131757
- Industry: Basic resources
- Predecessor: Société de Traitement des Minerais de Nickel, Cobalt et Autres; Higginson et Hanckar
- Founded: 18 May 1880
- Headquarters: Paris, France
- Key people: Christel Bories (Chairman and CEO)
- Products: Mining and extraction of manganese, steel alloys and nickel
- Revenue: €3,652 million (2017)
- Operating income: €608 million (2017)
- Net income: €203 million (2017)
- Total assets: €3.269 million (end 2017)
- Number of employees: 12,590 (end 2017)
- Website: www.eramet.com/en

Eramet is a French multinational mining and metallurgy company, listed on the Euronext Paris exchange under the symbol ERA.

The company produces non-ferrous metals and derivatives, nickel alloys and superalloys, and high-performance special steels.

Through its subsidiary Société Le Nickel (SLN), the company has its historical roots in nickel mining, and for over 100 years has maintained a large mining operation in the French overseas territory of New Caledonia. It is also a major producer of manganese from mines in Gabon.

Eramet's chairman and CEO as of 2017 was Christel Bories and its headquarters is in Paris.

== History ==
The company was founded with the funding of the Rothschild family (although they were careful to avoid being listed as founders of the company) in 1880. With discretion, the family took full control of the company in 1890.

Between 1907 and 2007 the Aubert & Duval organization of Issoire France was owned by Eramet and formed part of its alloy division. The subsidiary was purchased by a consortium of Airbus, Safran and Tikehau Capital.

In 2023, a worldwide fall in nickel prices exacerbated shortfalls in SLN's balance sheets, with ERAMET and the French government refusing to subsidise SLN.

In 2024–2025 Eramet lost a bid to associate with Chile's National Mining Enterprise (ENAMI) in the lithium mining project of Salares Altoandinos. Subsequently it became embroiled in a legal battle with ENAMI over access rights in the project area.

== Activities ==
Eramet is organised into three activities:

- ERAMET Manganese (48% of the group's turnover): Eramet's subsidiary Comilog extracts manganese in the Moanda mine in Gabon and then transforms it in its metallurgical and chemical factories located in China, in Europe and in the United States.
- ERAMET Alloys (32% of the group's turnover): Eramet elaborates special steels and superalloys as well as wrought pieces for the aeronautical and energy sectors.
- ERAMET Nickel (20% of the group's turnover): Eramet's subsidiary, Le Nickel-SLN extracts nickel in five mines in New Caledonia, mainly to produce stainless steel.

== Global presence ==
Eramet’s 47 sites are divided across the five continents as follows:

- 22 in Europe, among which 13 in France
- 13 in Asia and Pacific
- 7 in North America
- 2 in Latin America
- 4 in Africa

=== Joint ventures ===
- In 2012 Eramet subsidiary Aubert & Duval teamed up with Setforge and QuEST to start SQUAD, a closed-die forging company in India

== Corporate governance ==
Christel Bories, Eramet’s CEO, is at the head of the Board of Directors, which comprises nineteen members appointed for four years.

The Executive Committee has eight members.

== Controversies ==
=== Indonesia operations ===
Eramet has business interests in Halmahera island in Indonesia, where mining is threatening the survival of the uncontacted Togutil people, also known as the Hongana Manyawa. Eramet manages operations at the PT Weda Bay Nickel mine, the largest nickel mine in the world. Weda Bay Nickel has the largest mining concession on Halmahera island and more than three-quarters of that concession overlaps with the territories of uncontacted Hongana Manyawa people.

According to Survival International, there are around 3,500 Hongana Manyawa, and around 500 of them are uncontacted and refuse interactions with outsiders. In October 2023, a video was released that showed uncontacted Hongana Manyawa warning logging companies to stay away from their lands as bulldozers destroyed their forest. In June 2024, footage emerged of hungry members of the Hongana Manyawa asking miners at the Weda Bay Nickel mine for food after being forced off their lands.

In November 2025, a member of the Hongana Manyawa people of the Halmahera island led a protest outside Eramet's headquarters in Paris. Ngigoro, who was born uncontacted in the Indonesian rainforest, said he had travelled to France to confront French Eramet over the destruction of his people’s land. He told the Morning Star: “If they don’t stop the mining, my uncontacted relatives will die. The companies are getting rich from our deaths.”

=== Senegal operations ===
Eramet is also active in mineral sands mining in West Africa through its subsidiary Eramet Grande Côte, based in Senegal. Since 2014, this operation has extracted and processed heavy mineral sands along the Atlantic coast north of Dakar, producing zircon and titanium-bearing minerals such as ilmenite, rutile and leucoxene for export. The project has caused environmental degradation and community tensions, especially in the Grand Côte area.
