= Cutter Cove =

Mine in Magallanes Region, Chile

Cutter Cove mine
- Location: Brunswick Peninsula, Magallanes Region, Chile
- Products: Copper, gold, zinc
- Opened: 1971
- Closed: 1974

Cutter Cove is a closed polymetallic copper-gold-zinc mine in Magallanes Region. It lies in southwestern Brunswick Peninsula in an area without roads near the Strait of Magellan.

== Discoveries ==
The deposit was first discovered in September 1904 by the Welsh miner Gregorio Tomasovich and was then expoited until 1912 by a company with English capital and Spanish miners. In 1960 the mine was rediscovered by Chilean engineers from ENAP who years later started a mine with financing from ENAMI. ENAMI granted large loans to the company and also became owner of 20% of it. The apparent enthusiasm in ENAMI for the project caused some concern in Sociedad Nacional de Minería.

== Opening, operation and closure ==
The mine opened in 1971 but as the mining operation operated at a net loss it was closed in 1974. The ore contrate produced in this period was transported north in ships of the Chilean Navy to the ENAMI smelter of Fundición Ventanas near Valparaíso.

A 1973 report chartacterised the orebodies, previously though of as veins as irregular lenses of a metamorphosed sedimentary exhalative deposit. The National Geology and Mining Service (SERNAGEOMIN) classifies the ore deposit as "small" and list the following valuable minerals on the site; arsenopyrite, chalcopyrite, galena, pyrrhotite and sphalerite. Pyrite and quartz are classified as gangue minerals by SERNAGEOMIN. The main orebody mined at Cutter Cove have been Veta Cristina, once though to be a singular vein but later revealed to be a group at least twelve veins or lenses offset by faults.

== Possible reopening ==
Since about 2017 the company Redhill Magallanes, owned by Australian company 29Metals, have carried mineral exploration in and around the former mine. One estimate puts the opening of the mine anew in 2030, on the condition that a feasibility study yields positive results.

== See also ==
- Copper mining in Chile
- Gold mining in Chile
- Guarello Island – the location of a marble quarry near the Strait of Magellan
- Invierno mine – nearby coal mine
