= Recoleta Dam =

Recoleta
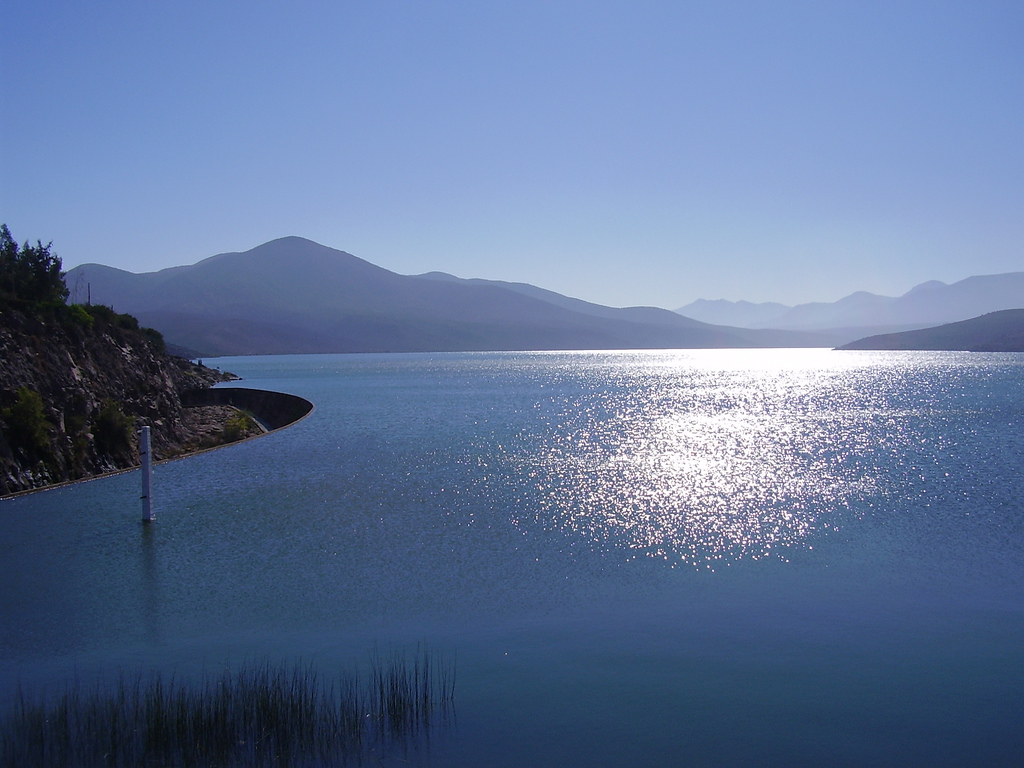

- Location within Coquimbo Region
- Coordinates: 30°29′S 71°06′W
- Type: Irrigation reservoir
- Primary inflows: Hurtado River
- Primary outflows: Hurtado River
- Basin countries: Chile
- Surface elevation: 383 metres (1,257 ft)

Recoleta is a reservoir located 16 kilometres (9.9 mi) northeast of the city of Ovalle, in the Coquimbo Region, Chile. The lake is situated northwest of El Rincon, 2.5 kilometres (1.6 mi) east of Penaflor, 4 kilometres (2.5 mi) south of Algarobbo and 6 kilometres (3.7 mi) west of La Ruca.
