= La Paloma Lake =

La Paloma
- Lago La Paloma
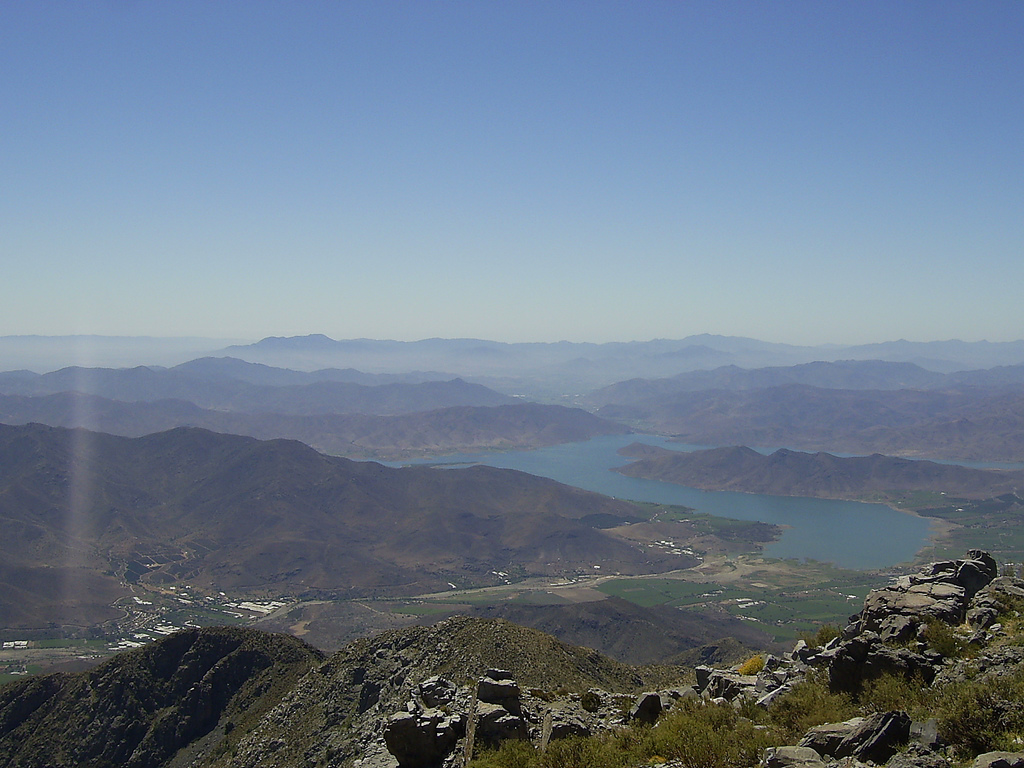
- The reservoir as seen from Cerro Huatulame

- Location within Coquimbo Region
- Coordinates: 30°45′S 71°0′W
- Type: Irrigation reservoir
- Primary inflows: Grande River
- Primary outflows: Grande River
- Basin countries: Chile
- Surface area: 30 km^{2} (12 sq mi)
- Water volume: 750×10^{6} m^{3} (610,000 acre⋅ft)

La Paloma is an artificial lake located 27 kilometres (17 mi) southeast of the city of Ovalle, in the Coquimbo Region, Chile. Although its primary purpose is to provide water for irrigation, the reservoir is also a popular recreational spot for locals and visitors. It was first inaugurated in 1968. It has an altitude of 328 metres (1,076 ft)
