= Salares Altoandinos =

Lithium mining project in Chile

- Location within Atacama Region Location within Chile
- Location: Diego de Almagro, Atacama Region, Chile; 26.5°S 69.00°W
- Products: Lithium carbonate
- Company: National Mining Enterprise; Rio Tinto

Salares Altoandinos (lit. "High Andean Saltflats") is a lithium mining project in Diego de Almagro, Atacama Region, Chile.

== Structure ==
The project is a public–private joint venture of National Mining Enterprise (ENAMI) and Rio Tinto, an association that is by contract set to last until 2060. Prior to the selection of Rio Tinto as partner Eramet had made a bid to associate with the Chilean state. The project is estimated to require an investment of US$3,000 million. The project could produce from 2032 to 2060 lithium carbonate equivalent (LCE) at an annual rate of 75,000 metric tons.

The three salt flats to be intervened for the mining of lithium-rich brine are Aguilar, Grande and La Isla.

== Disputes ==
Starting in July 2025 the project has been affected by a legal dispute in Chilean courts between ENAMI and Eramet over access rights in the project area. A similar dispute with Eramet affects Codelco's lithium mining project with Rio Tinto in Salar de Maricunga farther south.
