= Melica commersonii =

Scientific classification
- Kingdom: Plantae
- Clade: Embryophytes
- Clade: Tracheophytes
- Clade: Angiosperms
- Clade: Monocots
- Clade: Commelinids
- Order: Poales
- Family: Poaceae
- Subfamily: Pooideae
- Genus: Melica
- Species: M. commersonii

Binomial name
- Melica commersonii Nees ex Steud.

Species of grass

Melica commersonii is a species of grass endemic to Chile (Limari to Arauco).

== Description ==
The species is perennial and is caespitose as well. It culms are 20–120 centimetres (7.9–47.2 in) long with butt sheaths being herbaceous and pilose. The leaf-sheaths are smooth, tubular and have one closed end. They also have a glabrous surface that have reflexed hairs. The leaf-blades are 2.5–17 centimetres (0.98–6.69 in) long and 1.5–3.5 millimetres (0.059–0.138 in) wide and have a scabrous surface while the membrane is eciliated, lacerate, and is 2–7 millimetres (0.079–0.276 in) long. The panicle is open, linear, secund and is 5–18 centimetres (2.0–7.1 in) long. The main panicle branches are appressed and scabrous with panicle axis being dominant and scabrous as well.

Spikelets are elliptic, solitary and are 6–11 millimetres (0.24–0.43 in) long. They have fertile spikelets that are pediceled, the pedicels of which are ciliate, curved, filiform, and hairy. Lemma is chartaceous, lanceolated, and is 4.5–6 millimetres (0.18–0.24 in) long and 2–2.5 millimetres (0.079–0.098 in) wide. Its lemma have either erose or obtuse apex while the fertile lemma itself is chartaceous, keelless, oblong and is 5.5 millimetres (0.22 in) long. The species also carry 2–3 sterile florets which are barren, cuneate, clumped and are 1.5–2.5 millimetres (0.059–0.098 in) long. Both the upper and lower glumes are oblong, keelless, membranous, and are purple in colour. Their size is different though; Lower one is 6–11 millimetres (0.24–0.43 in) long while the upper one is 5.5–7 millimetres (0.22–0.28 in) long. Its palea have ciliolated keels and is 2-veined.

Flowers are fleshy, oblong, truncate, have 2 lodicules and grow together. They are also glabrous, 0.3–0.5 millimetres (0.012–0.020 in) long and have 3 anthers with fruits that are caryopsis. The fruit is dark brown in colour and have additional pericarp with a linear hilum.

== Ecology ==
Melica commersonii grows along the coast, in the hills of the Coastal and Andran Cordillera on the elevation of 1,900 metres (6,200 ft) and above sea level.
