= Bosque de Fray Jorge National Park =

Protected area in Chile

- IUCN category II (national park)
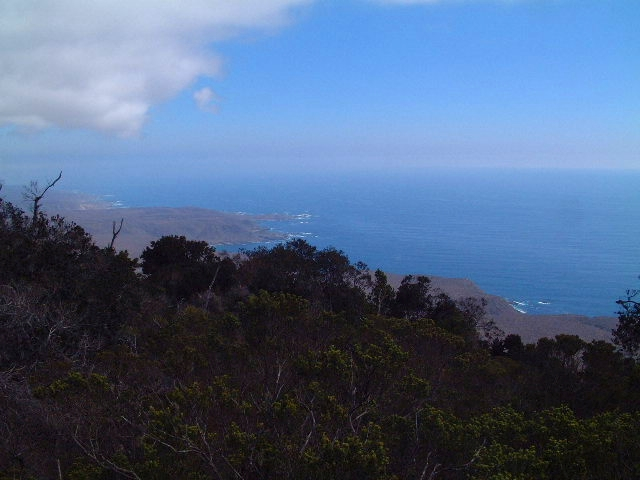
- Outlook over the national park

- Location within Chile
- Location: Coquimbo Region, Chile
- Nearest city: Ovalle
- Coordinates: 30°39′45″S 71°40′58″W
- Area: 100 km^{2} (39 sq mi)
- Established: 1941
- Visitors: 13,205 (in 2004)
- Governing body: Corporación Nacional Forestal

Ramsar Wetland
- Official name: Humedal del río Limarí, desde Salala hasta su desembocadura
- Designated: 21 July 2020
- Reference no.: 2424

Bosque de Fray Jorge national park or Bosque Fray Jorge national park (Spanish Parque Nacional Bosque Fray Jorge) lies in the Limarí Province, Coquimbo Region, Chile. It is a UNESCO biosphere reserve. Management of this and other national parks in Chile is entrusted to Corporacion Nacional Forestal, CONAF.

== Geography ==
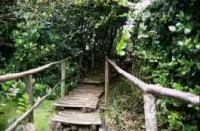

The national park lies approximately 100 km south of La Serena on the Pacific Ocean, as well as approximately 30 km to the west of Ovalle. It lies close to the Atacama Desert, in the Cordillera de Talinay, which is part of the Chilean Coastal Range. On the south, the park is bordered by the Limarí River, whose lower reaches have been designated as a protected Ramsar site since 2020.

The park covers an area of 100 km², but the forests cover only 4% of its surface. The national park is known for having the northernmost Valdivian temperate rain forests. The coastal fog (Spanish: Camanchaca) hangs on the mountain-slopes and moistens subtropical vegetation, allowing the hydrophilic forests to survive despite being surrounded by semiarid scrublands, with average annual rainfall of approximately 113 mm. The forest is a vestigial survival of the last glacial period. However, recent genetic research based on metazoans, suggests that the Fray Jorge Forest is a relic of the forests that occupied this landscape during the Paleogene / Neogene, which retracted due to the aridification of the region, with an approximate age of divergence with the southern forests of over 20 million years.

Typical plants of the national park include:

- Schinus latifolia
- Azara celastrina
- Lithraea venenosa
- Porlieria chilensis
- Olivillo (Aextoxicon punctatum)
- Epiphytes include Sarmienta scandens and Griselinia scandens.

The park also includes a large number of smaller animals, as common degu, chinchilla and foxes. Many different kinds of birds live in the park, such as the Chilean tinamou (Nothoprocta perdicaria) and the long-tailed meadowlark (Sturnella loyca).

== History ==
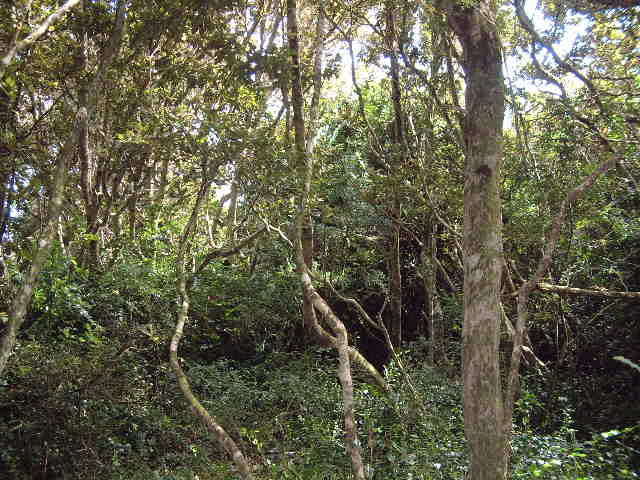
Olivillos forest

The place where today the Fray Jorge National Park is located was discovered in 1627 by a priest of the Franciscan order, who, due to a lack of timber in the area, set out to search for it with the help of some mules. After "miraculously" finding it at this location, he brought back some timber and used it to build part of the bell tower of the Church of San Francisco in La Serena. The Bosque de Fray Jorge National Park was established in 1941 and is administered by the Chilean forest authority CONAF. UNESCO incorporated the national park as a biosphere reservation in 1977.

== See also ==
- Cloud forest
