= Catedral (prospect) =

Coordinates: 34.161996°S 70.142989°W

- Interactive map of Catedral

Location
- Location: Santiago Metropolitan Region/O'Higgins Region, Chile

Production
- Products: Copper

Owner
- Company: ENAMI

Catedral is a mining prospect and porphyry copper ore deposit in the Andes along the border of Santiago Metropolitan Region and O'Higgins Region, Chile. It lies about 25 km southeast of El Teniente, Chile's third most productive copper mine. It is currently owned by the Chile's National Mining Enterprise (ENAMI) which classifies it as pertaining to the large-scale mining category and being greenfield in terms of exploration. The prospect extends over an altitudinal range of 2100 to 4800 m a.s.l. where glaciers and rock glaciers exist.
