= Esperanza mine =

Copper mine in Chile

- Location within Atacama Region Location within Chile
- Location: Atacama Region, Chile; 26°20′47.6″S 70°08′36.1″W
- Products: Copper

The Esperanza mine is an underground copper mine located in the Sierra Áspera mountains of Atacama Desert in northern Chile. The mine lies in the commune of Diego de Almagro in Atacama Region about 12 km northwest of the mining town of Diego de Almagro. The mine is owned by ENAMI which put it on tender for sale or rental in 2023 and again in May 2024. The mine lies about 20 km from ENAMI's processing plant of Planta El Salado.

On May 18 2020 the mine suffered an underground fire.
