= Casa de Moneda de Coquimbo =

Mint in La Serena, Chile

The Casa de Moneda de Coquimbo was a mint created in La Serena, established on September 27, 1827, due to the silver mining boom triggered by the discovery of silver at Arqueros (1825). From the point of view of the Chilean government of that period, to purchase silver and make coins in the province of Coquimbo was more economical than transport the silver to Santiago.

This mint is noted for being the only official mint located outside Santiago during the history of Chile.

Gregorio Cordovez del Caso was appointed as intendent of the mint on 24 June 1828.

== Location ==
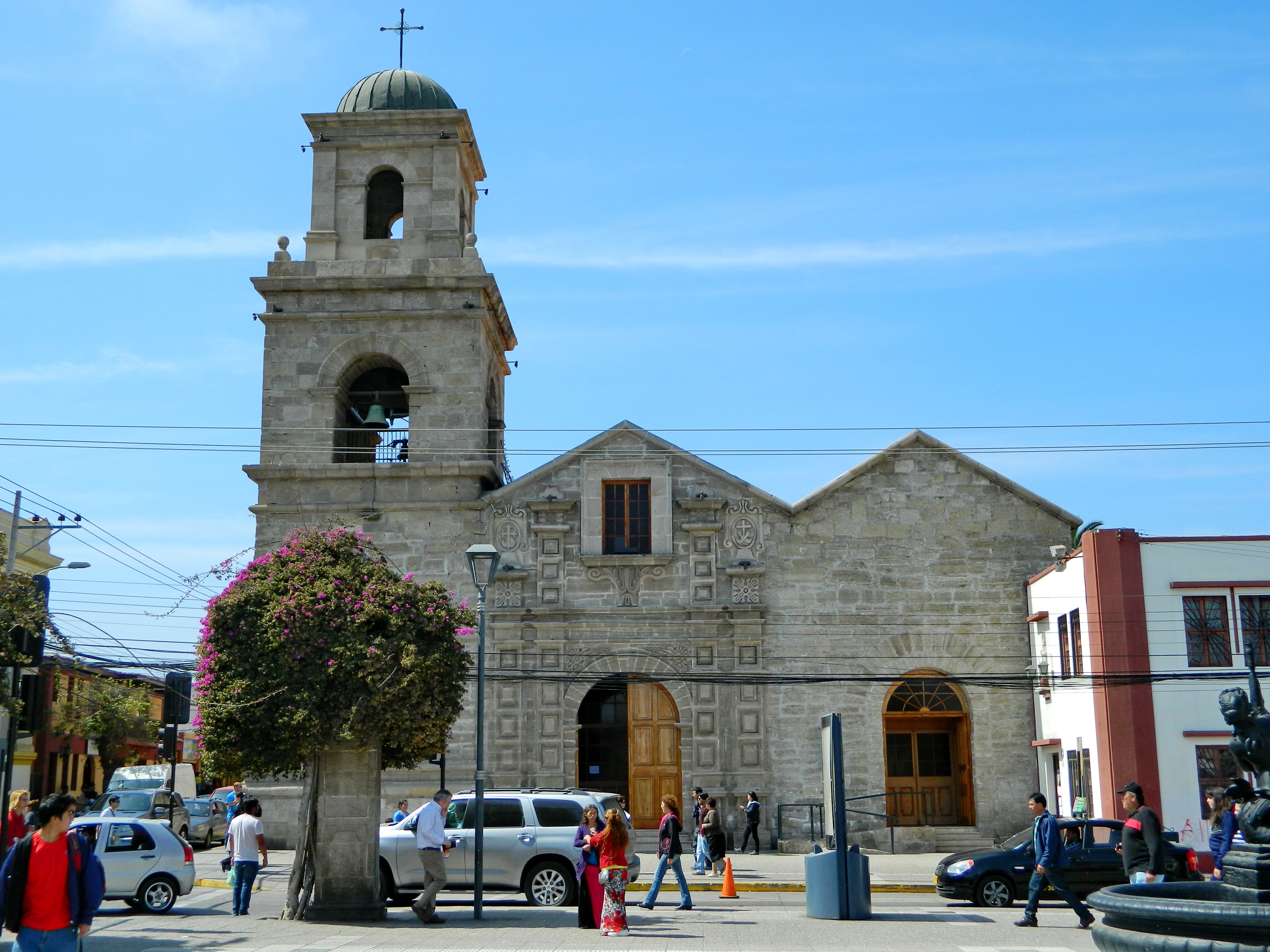
Church of San Francisco

The mint was housed in the cloister of the Iglesia de San Francisco, one of the oldest churches in the city.

== History ==
Despite the fact that the mines of the zone produced above 85% of the silver extracted in Chile between 1825-1832, the Casa de Moneda de Coquimbo never prospered as expected due to political reasons (the creation of the Coquimbo mint was contrary to the purposes of the superintendent of the Casa de Moneda de Santiago, José Santiago Portales). Only a few coins were minted in La Serena known individually as "Peso de Coquimbo" (Coquimbo One Peso Coin). According to some authors the mint facility was never operated as planned due to a defective production process, resulting in coins with features that did not match the design specifications. Finally, the "Pesos Coquimbo" were removed from circulation and mostly sent to Santiago to be melted.

On May 18, 1845 the minting machinery was sent to Valparaíso, which at that date was abandoned in the cloister of the Church of San Francisco.

Despite being a short-lived mint, various of its minted coins survived and presently occupy a prominent place in coin collections.

== Importance and name ==
The Casa de Moneda de Coquimbo was an important part of the history of the northern portion of Chile, when the Norte Chico's mining was the main support for the economy of the nascent republic of Chile. At the same time, the name Coquimbo has remained recorded in the history of the country. Coquimbo is a hispanized word and was the former name for the Elqui River since Pre-Columbian times and gave its name to the territory extending from the Atacama Desert to the Choapa River. Not to be confounded with "Coquimbo", department that was separated from La Serena en 1864.

== Coquimbo Peso ==
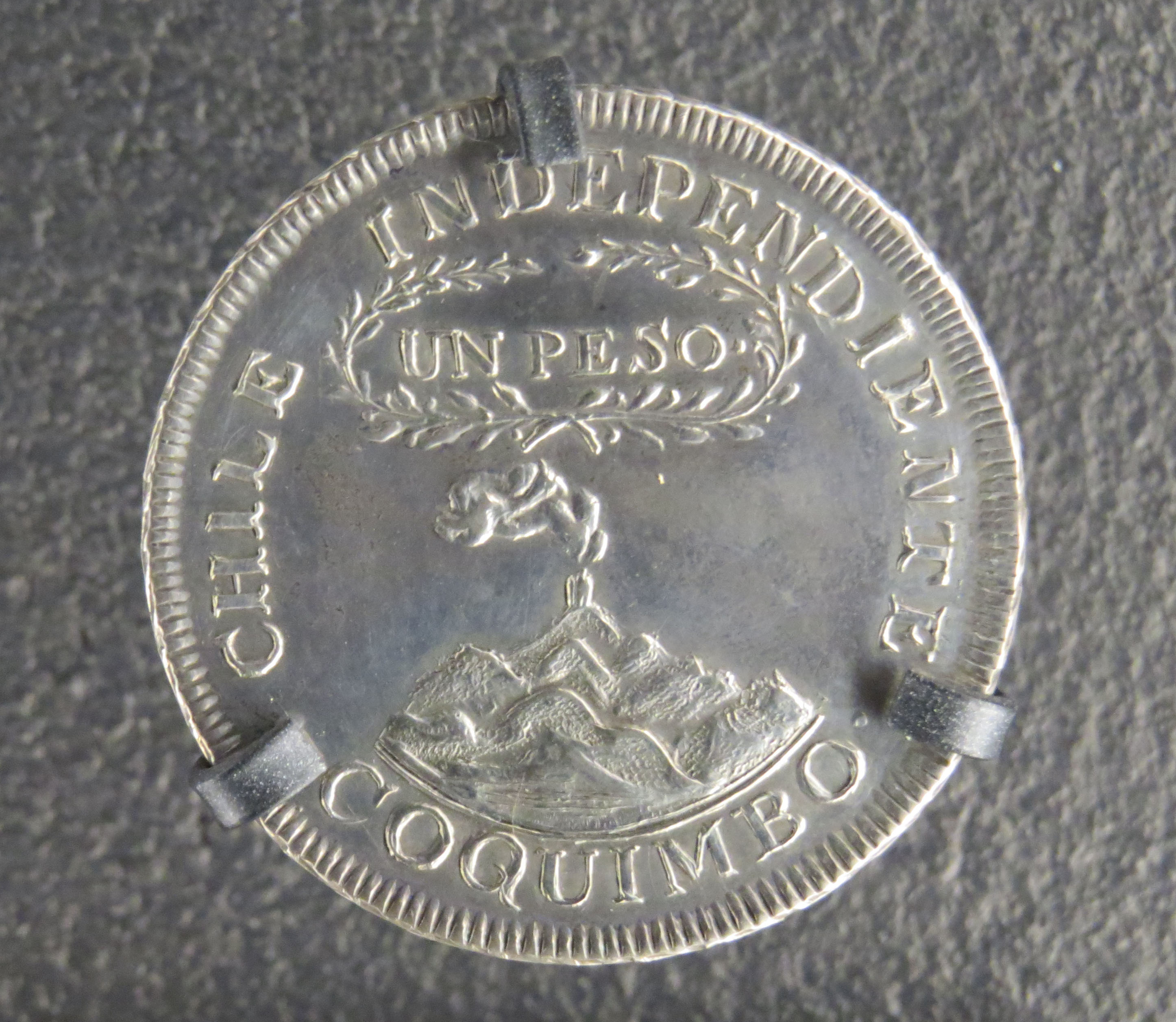
One Peso of the Province of Coquimbo (1828)

Presently, due to the rarity and scarcity of the coin, the Peso de Coquimbo is considered by the collectors as one of the most valuable coins in the numismatic world.

One of them is preserved in the British Museum in London, and was donated by the Bank of England in 1877. It was transported to Europe by David Ross, the then British Consul for the province of Coquimbo.

Another example of the coin is exhibited in the Museo Numismático del Banco Central de Chile, located in Santiago, and is the most expensive coin in the collection.
