= Panulcillo =

- Location within Coquimbo Region Location within Chile
- Location: Ovalle, Coquimbo Region, Chile; 30°28′34.21″S 71°13′12.36″W
- Products: Copper

Panulcillo is a copper ore deposit hosting various underground mines in north-central Chile about 15 km north of the city of Ovalle.

Etymologically Panulcillo means "little celery", with panul being a Mapuche word adopted into Chilean Spanish with the meaning of celery.

== Mining activity ==
Mining activity at Panulcillo dates at least back to mid-19th century. By 1863, the locality was connected by railroad to Ovalle and the port of Coquimbo. Mining activity peaked in the 1880s when ore grades were about 4% Cu per metric ton and 7,000 tons were mined yearly. In 1885, Panulcillo had 2,515 inhabitants, in 1907, it had 544 and by 1952, the population had declined to 76. Starting in the 1920s, the copper produce at Panulcillo had greatly diminished and independent pirquineros became dominant in the mining of Panulcillo, and by 1944, the local mining company ceased operations. Mined ore grades were about 3% Cu per ton from 1900 to the 1970s. Since the 1980s, the average ore grade mined at Panulcillo has been 2% Cu per ton.

The ore deposit is exploited by four underground mines of which the limits between the first three are horizontal levels:

- Panulcillo Alto
- Mina San Gregorio
- Mina Delta
- Mina Asunción

Panulcillo is part of a public-private mining cluster coordinated by state-owned ENAMI. ENAMI owns the mines and lease them to private companies. ENAMI also runs Planta Delta at Panulcillo which is mineral processing plant with LIX-SX-EW processing operated by a private company and flotation facilities and a mineral purchasing agency operated by ENAMI.

Mining at Panulcillo has caused subsidence, with the mining camp of La Condesa de Panulcillo subsiding a total of 30 m in the morning of June 24, 2021, following extensive rains. Two miners died and a sinkhole of over 100 m in diameter formed in the event.

== Geology ==
The ores are hosted in the Estratos del Reloj Formation deposited in the Cretaceous period. At Panulcillo Estratos del Reloj Formation crop out as a 600 m-high mountain and dips east 40° to 70°. This formation is intruded by slightly younger calc-alkaline plutons, among which the most common rock types are granodiorite, monzonite and compositions in-between (see QAPF diagram). Smaller igneous bodies have compositions that range from syenite to gabbro. At Panulcillo, aplite intrusions in limestone have decimeter-wide contacts of marble as result of recrystallization of limestone. Small amounts of pyrrhotite, chalcopyrite, pyrite, sphalerite and secondary covellite are found in these marbles.

To the east of Panulcillo lies the Arqueros Formation, a sequence of layers of sedimentary and volcanic rocks of similar age that are folded and generally deformed near Panulcillo. The orebody is bounded to the west by Panulcillo Fault, a displaced southern continuation of Romeral Fault. West of this lies the Estratos de Tamaya Formation.

There are two main orebodies of copper in Panulcillo each with a lensoid shape and dipping to the east, more-or-less similar to the stratigraphy of Estratos del Reloj Formation. Locally these are called mantos (lit. sheets). The upper manto has its mineralization in the form of numerous veins that host chalcopyrite, pyrite, pyrrhotite. To some lesser extent is also sphalerite and galena in these veins. The lower manto is found 250 to 300 m below the surface and contains primary chalcopyrite and bornite as copper minerals, and there is also smaller amounts of pyrite and pyrrhotite. In the lower manto bornite is concentrated in the inner parts of the lensoid while pyrite is proportionally more abundant in the outer zone. The gangue minerals associated to the sulphides of Panulcillo are mainly calcic amphibole, calcite, chlorite, magnetite, feldspar, quartz and biotite, but these last three are less common. Because of its depth, the lower manto was only discovered by chance in 1994 by drillings of ENAMI.

The deposits host an estimated 2.75 to 3.5% of copper per ton. Gold minerals are scarce in Panulcillo, yet the deposits are thought to host 1 to 1/2 grams of gold per ton.

The ores of the copper mine are thought to have formed in association to magmas that cooled into rock in the Cretaceous, this same magmatic pulse is otherwise linked elsewhere to the formation of iron and phosphorus deposits of the Chilean Iron Belt. Both the copper and the iron-phosphorus deposits have been posited to be end-members of the same system of the iron oxide copper gold ore deposits. In addition, the Panulcillo ores have also characteristics of a skarn as the magmas intruded limestone.
