= Iglesia de San Francisco (La Serena) =

National monument of Chile

Coordinates: 29.9046°S 71.2497°W

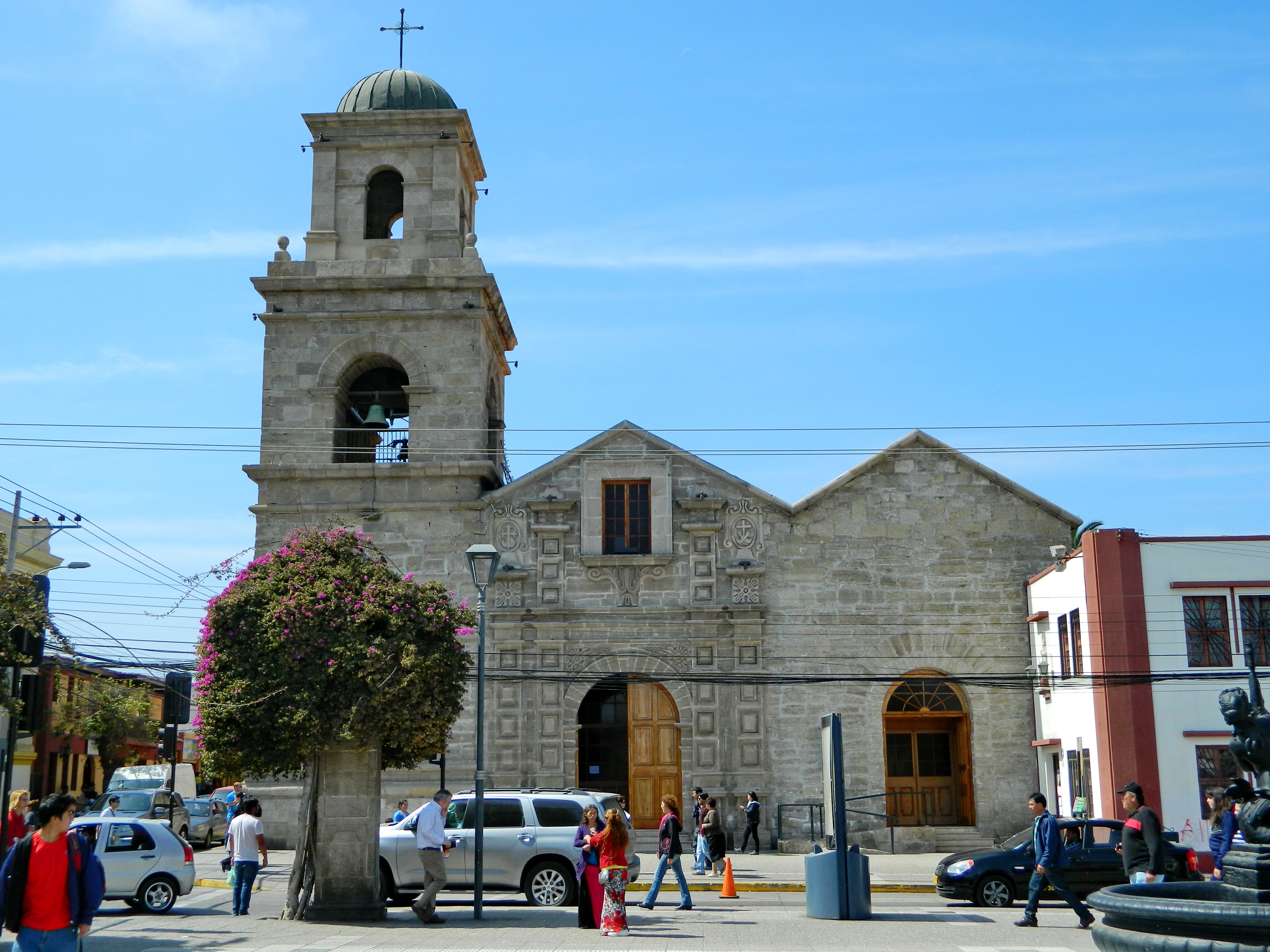

Religion
- Affiliation: Roman Catholic

Location
- Municipality: La Serena
- Country: Chile
- Interactive map of Iglesia de San Francisco

Architecture
- Architects: Francisco Medina; Juan Carbero; Francisco Román

The Iglesia de San Francisco is a Catholic church located in La Serena, Chile. It was declared a National Monument of Chile in 1977.

== History ==
The origins of the church go back to 1563 when the Franciscan Order arrived in La Serena. The construction of the present church began in 1590. It was built by Fray Francisco Medina, Juan Carbero and Francisco Román using limestone quarried from Peñuelas Alto and wood from Fray Jorge Forest. The church was inaugurated on December 25, 1627.

It was the only church that was not torched by a group of pirates led by Bartholomew Sharp in 1680. The church was damaged by the 1730 Valparaíso earthquake. The restoration work was completed in 1755. Another earthquake in 1796 provoked the collapse of the tower.

The cloister was seized by the government in 1824 and was used as a mint for a few years, which operated under the name Casa de Moneda de Coquimbo. In 1858 the cloister was returned to the Franciscan Order.

Around 1870, the Spanish colonial roof tiles were replaced with wood shingles. From 1878 the church underwent several alterations. The tower of ashlar masonry was partially demolished, leaving only the dado and the first stage. The original plan was modified. The main facade was remodeled with the addition of three symmetrical doors, changing the architectural style to Renaissance Revival. The church was re-inaugurated on October 1, 1899.

Its main facade was plastered in 1913 and the 1922 Vallenar earthquake destroyed the tower. In 1923 was built a reinforced concrete tower. The 1975 Coquimbo earthquake badly damaged the church. The concrete tower was demolished in 1975 and the stucco was removed from the church, leaving exposed the original stone.
