= Ovalle =

- City and Commune
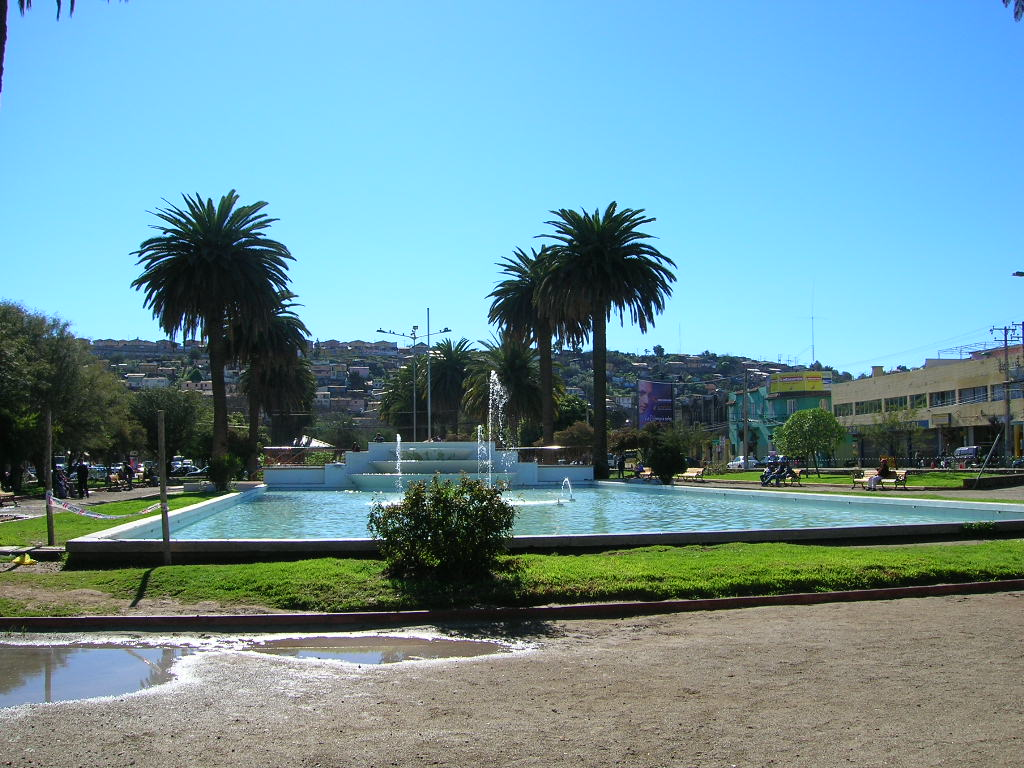

- Flag Coat of arms Location in Chile
- Interactive map of Ovalle
- Coordinates: 30°36′S 71°12′W
- Country: Chile
- Region: Coquimbo
- Province: Limarí
- Founded: 1831

Government
  - Type: Municipality
  - Alcalde: Hector Vega Campusano

Area
  - Total: 3,834.5 km^{2} (1,480.5 sq mi)
- Elevation: 215 m (705 ft)

Population (2012 Census)
  - Total: 103,734
  - Density: 27.053/km^{2} (70.066/sq mi)
  - Urban: 73,790
  - Rural: 24,299

Sex
  - Men: 47,805
  - Women: 50,284
- Time zone: UTC−4 (CLT)
  - Summer (DST): UTC−3 (CLST)
- Postal code: 1840000
- Area code: 56 + 53
- Climate: BSh
- Website: Official website (in Spanish)

Ovalle is a city in the Coquimbo Region of Chile, founded in 1831 as a settlement. It has a population of more than 113,000 people. The name Ovalle was chosen in honor of José Tomás Ovalle, former Chilean vice president and two-time acting president. Ovalle is the capital of the Limarí Province.

The city's setting is often likened to an oasis, being lush and green although surrounded by barren hills. The city lies amidst a mining district with the copper mine of Panulcillo and the iron mine of El Dorado lying in its immediate vicinities. Next ot Panulcillo state-owned company ENAMI operates Planta Delta which purchases and processes ore from local small-scale miners.

There is a trail leading from the city that lasts roughly 50 minutes, and features relatively safe bathing and an area where dinosaur fossils can be found. On the trail is a life-sized model of a brachiosaurus.

The town's football club is Deportes Ovalle. Famous players have played for the club, including 1982 FIFA World Cup player Rodolfo Dubó.

== Demographics ==
According to the 2002 census of the National Statistics Institute, Ovalle spans an area of 3,834.5 km^{2} (1,481 sq mi) and has 98,089 inhabitants (47,805 men and 50,284 women). Of these, 73,790 (75.2%) lived in urban areas and 24,299 (24.8%) in rural areas. The population grew by 15.4% (13,107 persons) between the 1992 and 2002 censuses.

== Climate ==
The climate is semi-desertic. Ovalle has hot and dry summers, with temperatures in the range 22–33 °C. Winters are humid and fresh, and is when rains occur. The temperatures in winter are generally lower than nearby cities like La Serena or Punitaqui, due to cold winds that come from the Andes through the Ovalle valley. Temperatures rarely fall below -5 °C.

Climate data for Ovalle
Month	Jan	Feb	Mar	Apr	May	Jun	Jul	Aug	Sep	Oct	Nov	Dec	Year
Mean daily maximum °C (°F)	28.4 (83.1)	28.3 (82.9)	26.8 (80.2)	23.9 (75.0)	21.0 (69.8)	18.4 (65.1)	18.1 (64.6)	19.6 (67.3)	21.7 (71.1)	23.8 (74.8)	25.8 (78.4)	27.4 (81.3)	23.6 (74.5)
Daily mean °C (°F)	19.8 (67.6)	19.8 (67.6)	17.6 (63.7)	15.2 (59.4)	13.2 (55.8)	11.4 (52.5)	10.9 (51.6)	11.7 (53.1)	13.4 (56.1)	14.8 (58.6)	16.9 (62.4)	18.6 (65.5)	15.3 (59.5)
Mean daily minimum °C (°F)	13.0 (55.4)	12.4 (54.3)	11.0 (51.8)	9.2 (48.6)	7.7 (45.9)	6.5 (43.7)	6.1 (43.0)	6.5 (43.7)	7.7 (45.9)	8.6 (47.5)	9.9 (49.8)	11.5 (52.7)	9.2 (48.5)
Average precipitation mm (inches)	0.0 (0.0)	1.1 (0.04)	0.7 (0.03)	2.1 (0.08)	29.5 (1.16)	42.1 (1.66)	26.9 (1.06)	21.2 (0.83)	5.7 (0.22)	2.7 (0.11)	0.9 (0.04)	1.1 (0.04)	134 (5.27)
Average relative humidity (%)	74	65	69	73	76	78	78	76	73	69	66	64	72
Source: Bioclimatografia de Chile

== Administration ==
As a commune, Ovalle is a third-level administrative division of Chile administered by a municipal council, headed by an alcalde who is directly elected every four years. The 2012-2016 alcalde is Claudio Rentería Larrondo.

Within the electoral divisions of Chile, Ovalle is represented in the Chamber of Deputies by Pedro Velásquez (Ind.) and Matías Walker (PDC) as part of the 8th electoral district, (together with Coquimbo and Río Hurtado). The commune is represented in the Senate by Gonzalo Uriarte (UDI) and Jorge Pizarro Soto (PDC) as part of the 4th senatorial constituency (Coquimbo Region).

== Notable people ==
The pediatrician and biochemist Hermann Niemeyer, one of the central figures in the development of biochemistry in Chile, was born in Ovalle in 1918. Elisa Berroeta was born in Ovalle and was a wood engraver and illustrator, active in Santiago and Paris.

== Gallery ==
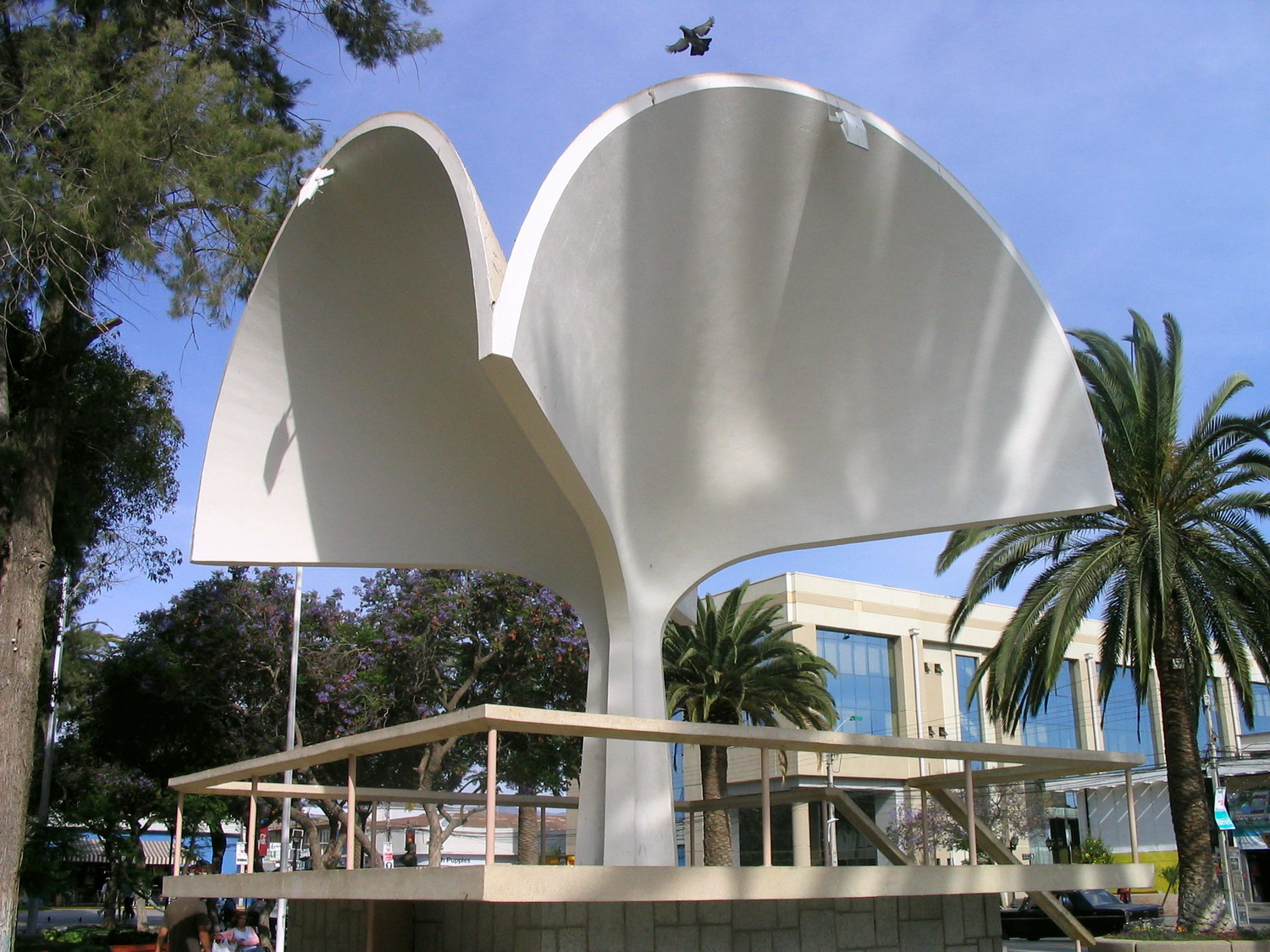
Public Square Kiosk

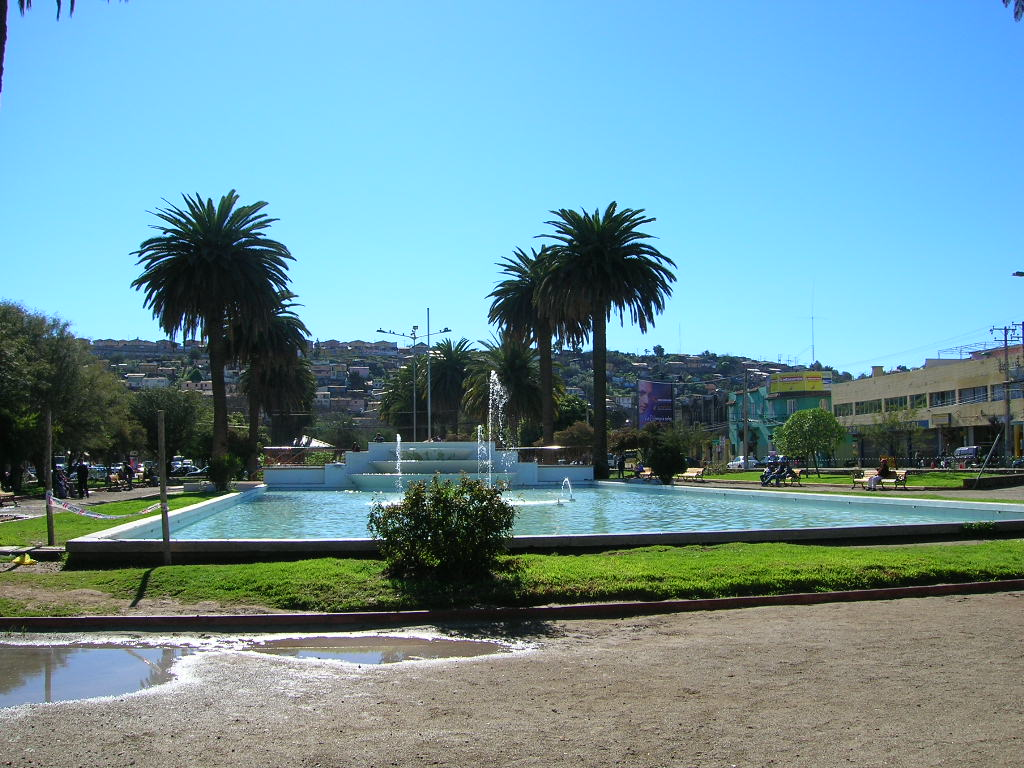
Vista de Ovalle

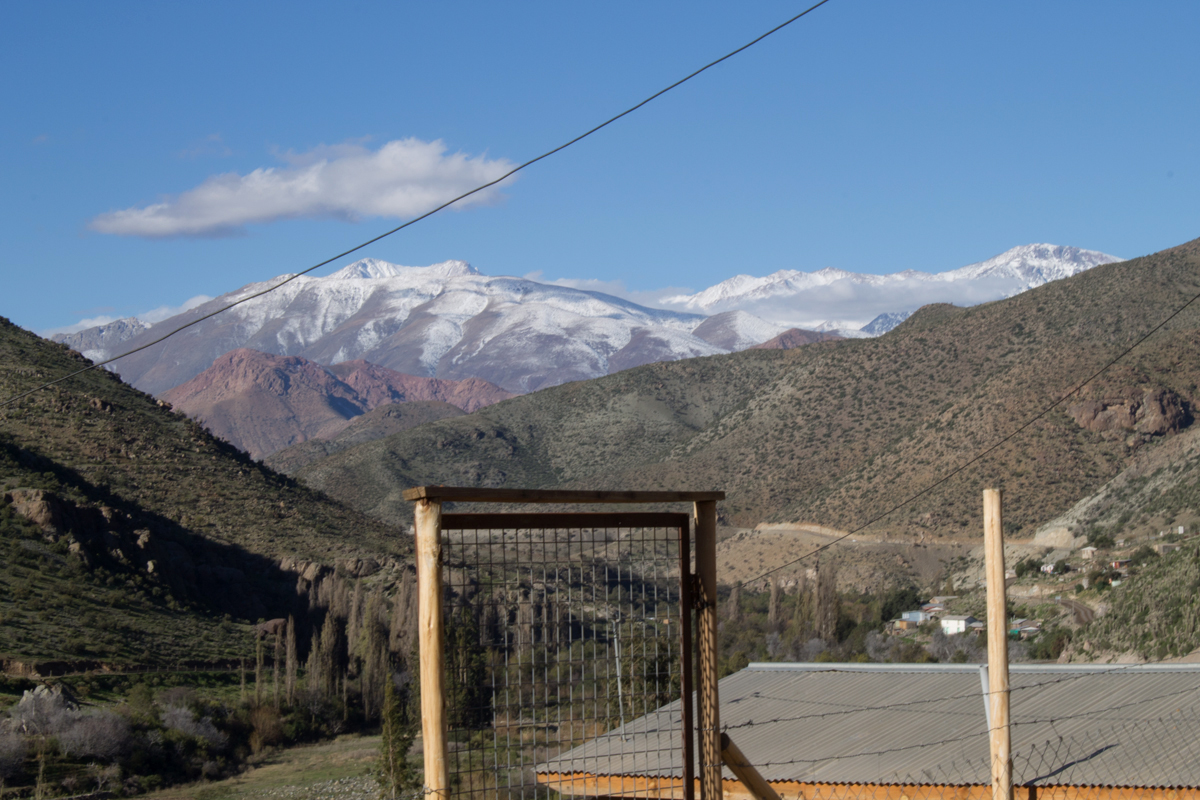
The Andean Mountains as seen from Fundina, Ovalle, Chile.

== See also ==
- Bosque de Fray Jorge National Park
- Embalse La Paloma
- Embalse Recoleta
