= El Inglés mine =

Copper mine in O'Higgins, Chile

Coordinates: 34.073611°S 70.8825°W

El Inglés
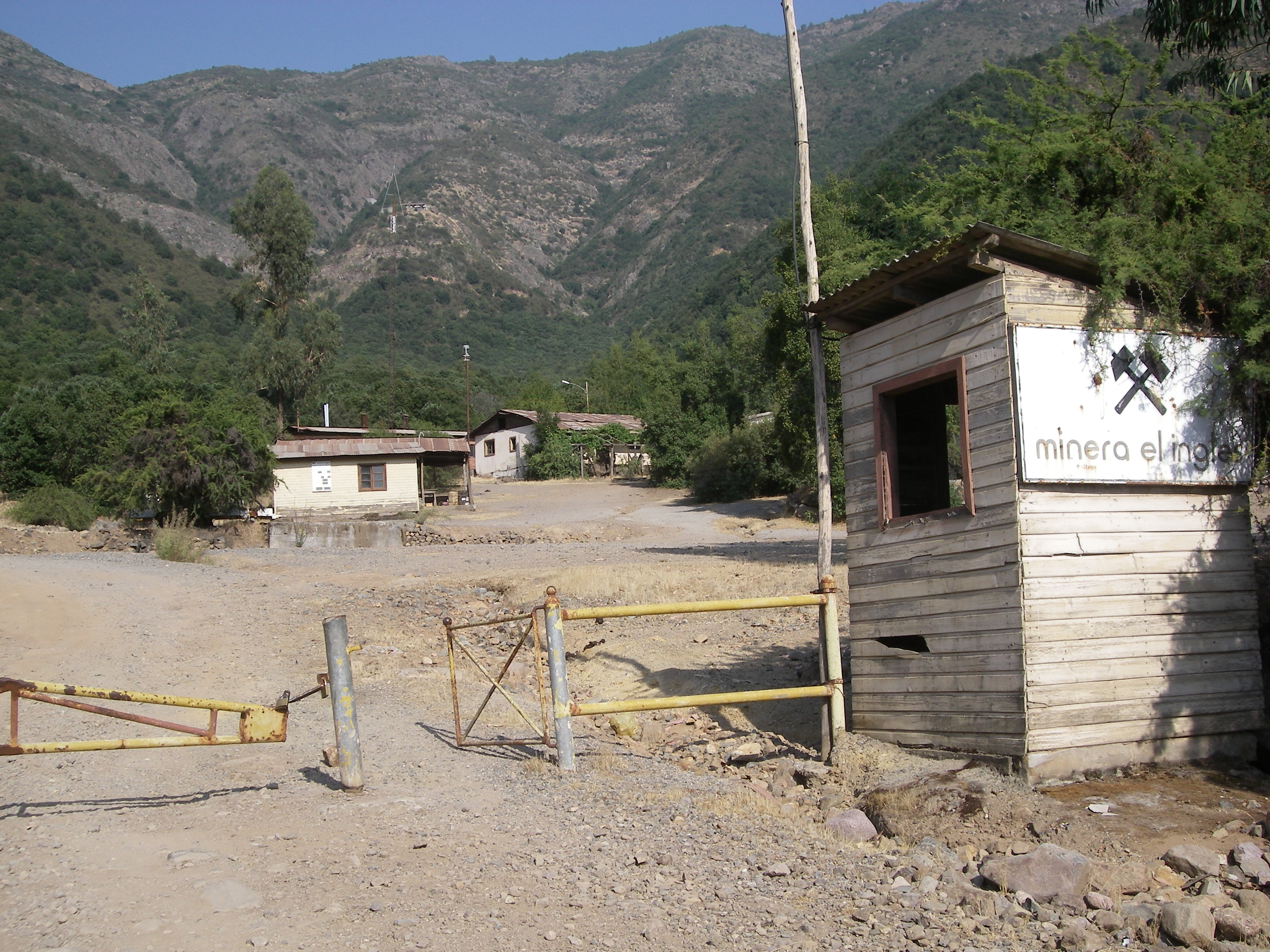
- Entrance to mine area

- Location within Chile
- Location: Commune of Rancagua, O'Higgins Region, Chile
- Products: Copper, gold
- Company: Compañía Minera El Inglés

The El Inglés mine is a copper mine located in O'Higgins Region, Chile, 15 km northwest of the city of Rancagua. It is the oldest deposit in the Chancón mining district.

The mine is located in the Farellones Formation and consists of a vein system from which copper is extracted, as well as gold and tin in smaller quantities. It covers an area of approximately ten hectares and is located between the Anita and La Mina ravines, on the northeastern slopes of a massif of the Chilean Coast Range.

It was owned by the National Mining Enterprise in the 1970s. In 1975, the El Inglés treatment plant began operations through the mining contract company Minera El Inglés. Beginning in 1984, the company was acquired by CEMIN and processed its own and purchased gold ores using the flotation process until 1998. On December 29, 2011, the Graneros Mining Company acquired the company, changing its corporate name to Compañía Minera El Inglés on March 19, 2012. The mine was fined by National Geology and Mining Service in 2016 for illegally raising the walls of its tailings dam.

In the 1950s, the film Llampo de sangre (lit. "Flash of Blood") was filmed at the mine, based on the novel of the same name by Oscar Castro, a local man from Rancagua.
