= Invierno mine =

Coal mine in Riesco Island, Chile

Coordinates: 52.885833°S 71.585°W

Location of Invierno mine in Magallanes Region.

Invierno mine (Mina Invierno: lit. Winter Mine) is a coal mine in Riesco Island, Chile, that was active from 2013 to 2020. The mine exported coal extracted from Loreto Formation to northern Chile and to other countries. The enterprise in charge of the project declared initially the works would occupy an area of 1500 ha representing 0.3% of the area of Riesco Island. Reportedly, it was initially projected to be the first of five coal mines in Riesco Island to be established by Von Appen and Angelini. The development of the mine included both the clearing of Magellanic subpolar forests and the reforestation of areas burned down during the Chilean settlement of Magallanes more than 100 years ago.

In 2016 it was recognized by Mining.com as the southernmost mine on the planet. By area, Invierno is the largest mine to have ever existed in Chile.

In 2019 the Third Environmental Court of Valdivia withdrew permission to mine by blasting in Invierno mine, effectively causing the mine to initiate a mine closure process that ended all mining in 2020. The closing of the mine and the COVID-19 pandemic in Chile are credited for the economic downturn Magallanes Region experienced in the early 2020s.

Before closure, the mine had about 1,000 employees.

== See also ==
- Cutter Cove – nearby polymetallic mine
- Tierra del Fuego gold rush
