= Pollution in Quintero and Puchuncaví =

The Chilean port of Quintero and adjacent Puchuncaví have made themselves known for their pollution in the 2010s and 2020s. They have together been characterized as a sacrifice zone. The zone hosts the coal-fired Ventanas Power Plant, an oil refinery, a cement storage, Fundición Ventanas, a copper foundry and refinery, a lubricant factory and a chemical terminal. In total 15 polluting companies operate in the area.

In 1992 there was a judicial appeal filed by five women from Puchuncavi against Fundición Ventanas and Chilgener, this was filed against the refinery for the toxic clouds it emitted. In areas near the polluting industries, testing in 1997 showed high levels copper in the soil. High level of selenium and copper were also found in rainwater near the industries. In 2011, Escuela La Greda located in Puchuncaví, was engulfed in a chemical cloud from the Ventanas Industrial Complex. The sulfur cloud poisoned an estimated 33 children and 9 teachers, resulting in the relocation of the school. The old location of the school is now abandoned. In August and September 2018 there was a public health crisis in Quintero and Puchuncaví, where over 300 people experienced illness from toxic substances in the air, coming from the polluting industries.

In 2022 the environmental conditions of Quintero, Puchuncaví and Concón were discussed in the Senate of Chile.

In June 2022 President Gabriel Boric announced Codelco's decision to begin a closure process of Fundición Ventanas.

In March 2023, mass poisonings continued to occur, with over a hundred school-aged children and adults being affected in less than two weeks.

In May 2023, the copper smelter, Codelco, officially ceased operations. The company stated that the closure of its Ventanas division demonstrates the company's decisive move towards more sustainable mining.

== Mobilization ==
Mujeres de Zona de Sacrificio played a large role in the mobilizations of this cause. This group of female residents of the area was formed in 2016 when issues related to residents' health and environment began to occur. They learned about the health impacts of living in a polluted environment and protested demanding accountability from state authorities and from the polluting industries.

Together with the Terram Foundation and the Chilean Human Rights Institute (INDH), the groups worked together to bring this case to litigation in September 2018. The INDH filed a constitutional protection action in the Court of Appeals of in Valparaiso after visiting the bay for three days, finding violations to the constitutional rights of the residents.

According to their Facebook page "Mujeres de Zona de Sacrificio Quintero - Puchuncaví en Resistencia", recent posts share evidence and testimonies of the ongoing issues, including unbreathable air, schools being affected by toxic conditions and symptoms of poisonings.
