= Chañaral Province =

Chañaral Province Provincia de Chañaral
- Province
- Seal Location in the Atacama Region Location in Chile
- Coordinates: 26°17′S 69°52′W
- Country: Chile
- Region: Atacama
- Capital: Chañaral
- Communes: Chañaral; Diego de Almagro

Government
  - Type: Provincial

Area
  - Total: 24,436.2 km^{2} (9,434.9 sq mi)

Population (2024 Census)
  - Total: 23,742
  - Density: 0.97159/km^{2} (2.5164/sq mi)
- Time zone: UTC−4 (CLT)
  - Summer (DST): UTC-3 (CLST)
- Area code: 56 + 52
- Website: Delegation of Chañaral

Chañaral Province (Spanish: Provincia de Chañaral) is one of three provinces in the Atacama Region (III) of Chile. It spans an area of 24,436.2 km^{2} (9,434.9 sq mi) and has its capital Chañaral. It had a population of 23,742 inhabitants as per the 2024 Chilean census.

== History ==
Chile was re-organized into twelve regions including the Atacama Region by Law No. 575 enacted on 10 July 1974. The Atacama Region consists of three provinces including Chañaral.

Chañaral is derived from the Quechua language and means "place of the chanar trees". The chanar (Geoffroea decorticans) is a native tree of Chile, and the name references to the abundance of these trees in the region.

== Geography ==
Chañaral Province is one of the three provinces of the Atacama Region in Chile. It covers an area of 24,436.2 km^{2} (9,434.9 sq mi). About 42% of the land area is part of an endorheic basin, 30% of the area belongs to the Salado River basin, with the remaining land made up of coastal region and offshore islands. Most of the province is covered by the Atacama Desert, with only 9 ha (22 acres) of the province covered by forest.

Chañaral is the northernmost and the most arid of the three provinces of the Atacama Region. It borders the Antofagasta Province to the north, and Copiapó Province to the south. The topography consists of largely flat coastal plains, with white sand near the coast. The region has a desert climate with very low rainfall, about 0.64 mm (0.025 in) on average annually.

== Administration ==
As a province, Chañaral is a second-level administrative division of Chile, governed by a provincial governor. It is further subdivided into two communes (comunas)–Chañaral and Diego de Almagro. The city of Chañaral serves as the capital of the province.

== Demographics ==
According to the 2024 Chilean census, the province had a population of 23,742 inhabitants. The population consisted of 11,891 males (50.1%) and 11,851 females (49.9%). About 20.7% of the population was below the age of 15 years, 66.6% belonged to the age group of 15–64 years, and 12.7% was aged 65 years or older. The province had an urban population of 21,232 inhabitants (89.4%) and a rural population of 2,510 inhabitants (10.6%). Most of the residents were born in Chile, accounting for 22,544 inhabitants (95.0%). Indigenous people formed 3,703 inhabitants (15.6%) of the population, while 20,035 inhabitants (84.4%) identified themselves as non-indigenous. Roman Catholics formed the largest religious group with 10,757 adherents (57.5%), followed by Evangelicals or Protestants with 2,676 adherents (14.3%), and 4,796 inhabitants (25.6%) indicating no religious affiliation.

== Economy ==
Mining, especially copper, is the major economic activity, with solar power generation developing as an upcoming sector. Fishing is practiced along the coast. Due to the lack of economic opportunities, and dependence on copper mining, the price of copper has a direct impact on the economy of the province. The provincial coast is also contaminated from debris, tailings, and remnants from the mining industry.
