= Fundición Ventanas =

Coordinates: 32.7592°S 71.4820°W

Fundición Ventanas is an electrolytic refinery and former copper smelter plant in Quintero, Valparaíso Region, Chile. It is owned by Codelco. The plant produces a significant amount of sulfuric acid. During its time as smelter its emissions of sulfur dioxide, an atmospheric contaminant, was within the limits allowed by Chilean environmental law but below international standards. According to Codelco's CEO André Sougarret one of the problems of Fundición Ventanas is that on a third of the year's days meteorological "conditions are adverse for the dispersal" of its gas emissions.

In June 2022 the government of Chile announced that a closure process for the plant was to begin. Its workers have protested against the closure. There is no consensus on where to build a new larger and more modern plant in replacement. Antofagasta Region and Atacama Region has been proposed by Chilean industry scholars as viable replacements. Others have argued for keeping smelting in Valparaíso Region given the existence of nearby mines. While some argue the replacement plant should be near the coast, inland Chuquicamata and El Salvador have also been proposed as alternatives. The president of the National Mining Society (Sonami), Diego Hernández, estimates the construction period for a new smelter plant to be 5 to 7 years. A 2024 study identified Antofagasta Region as the best place for a new copper smelter given logistical advantages and an existing and expandable supply of copper concentrate from nearby mines. In December 2025 Codelco signed a memorandum of understanding with Glencore to establish a new copper smelter in Antofagasta Region.

The smelter closed in 2023 but the electrolytic refinery that is part of the smelter complex was not affected by the closure and continues its operations. The complex also remains open to receive ore from small and medium-scale mining. Slag of the copper smelter –which consists mainly of iron silicates– is being studied as of 2025 for its recycling as furnitude or as construction material by local entrepreneurs.

== See also ==
- Alexander Sutulov
- Copper mining in Chile
- List of copper smelters in Chile
- Pirquinero
- Pollution in Quintero and Puchuncaví
