= Hurtado River =

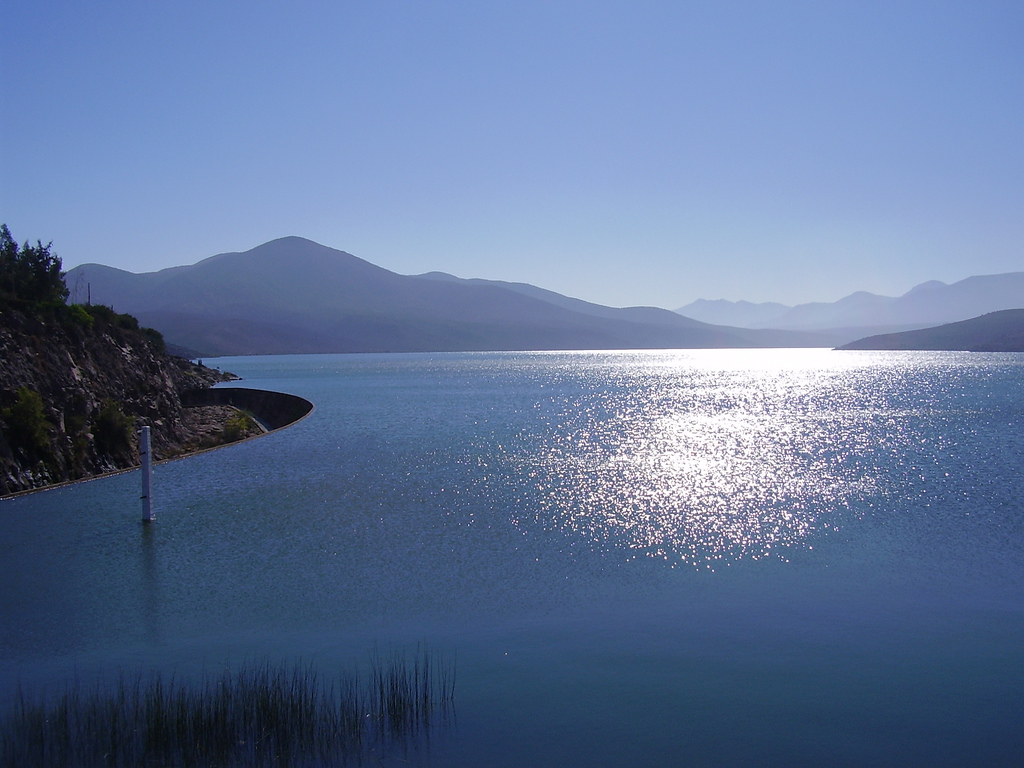

Location
- Country: Chile

The Hurtado River is a river of Chile.

== See also ==
- List of rivers of Chile
