= Diego de Almagro, Chile =

Diego de Almagro
- City and Commune
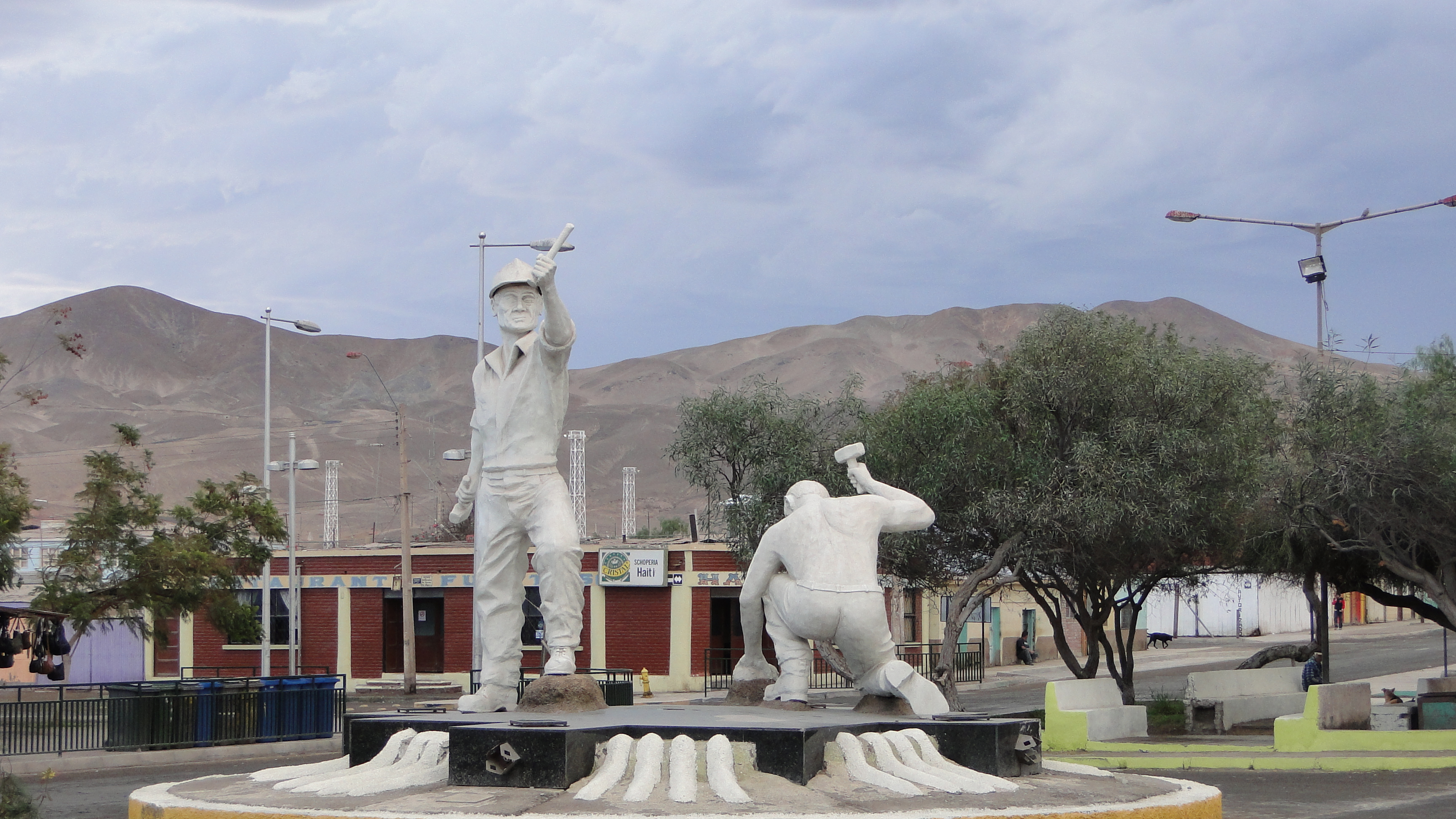
- Monument to the Miners

- Coat of arms Location of Diego de Almagro commune in Atacama Region Location in Chile
- Coordinates: 26°23′28″S 70°02′45″W
- Country: Chile
- Region: Atacama
- Province: Chañaral
- Named for: Diego de Almagro

Government
  - Type: Municipality
  - Alcalde: Mario Araya (RN)

Area
  - Total: 18,663.8 km^{2} (7,206.1 sq mi)
- Elevation: 787 m (2,582 ft)

Population (2024)
  - Total: 11,397
  - Density: 0.61065/km^{2} (1.5816/sq mi)
  - Urban: 10,806
  - Rural: 59
- Time zone: UTC−4 (CLT)
  - Summer (DST): UTC−3 (CLST)
- Area code: 56 + 52
- Website: Municipality of Diego de Almagro

Diego de Almagro (Spanish pronunciation: [ˈdjeɣo ðe alˈmaɣɾo]) is a city and commune in the Chañaral Province of the Atacama Region in Chile. The commune has a population of 11,397 in an area of 18,663.8 km^{2} (7,206 sq mi).

Various mines and mineral prospects lie in the commune including the copper mines of Esperanza and El Salvador and the polymetallic Santo Domingo project.

== Name ==
The area is named after Diego de Almagro, a conquistador.

Until 1977, the city was named Pueblo Hundido ("Sunk Town").

== Demographics ==
As of the 2024 census, the population is 11,397, of which 49.8% are male and 50.2% are female. People under 15 years old make up 21.2% of the population, and people over 65 years old make up 10.3%. 94.8% of the population is urban and 5.2% is rural.

Historical population
| Year | Pop. | ±% p.a. |
|---|---|---|
| 1970 | 23,800 | — |
| 1982 | 26,201 | +0.80% |
| 1992 | 27,515 | +0.49% |
| 2002 | 18,589 | −3.85% |
| 2017 | 13,925 | −1.91% |
| 2024 | 11,397 | −2.82% |
Source: INE, Memoria Chilena

=== Immigration ===
As of the 2024 census, immigrants make up 6.4% of the population - 5.7% are from South America, 0.6% from North America, 0.04% from Europe, and 0.01% from Oceania.

== Administration ==
As a commune, Diego de Almagro is a third-level administrative division of Chile administered by a municipal council, headed by an alcalde (mayor) who is directly elected every four years.
