= Río Hurtado =

- Commune
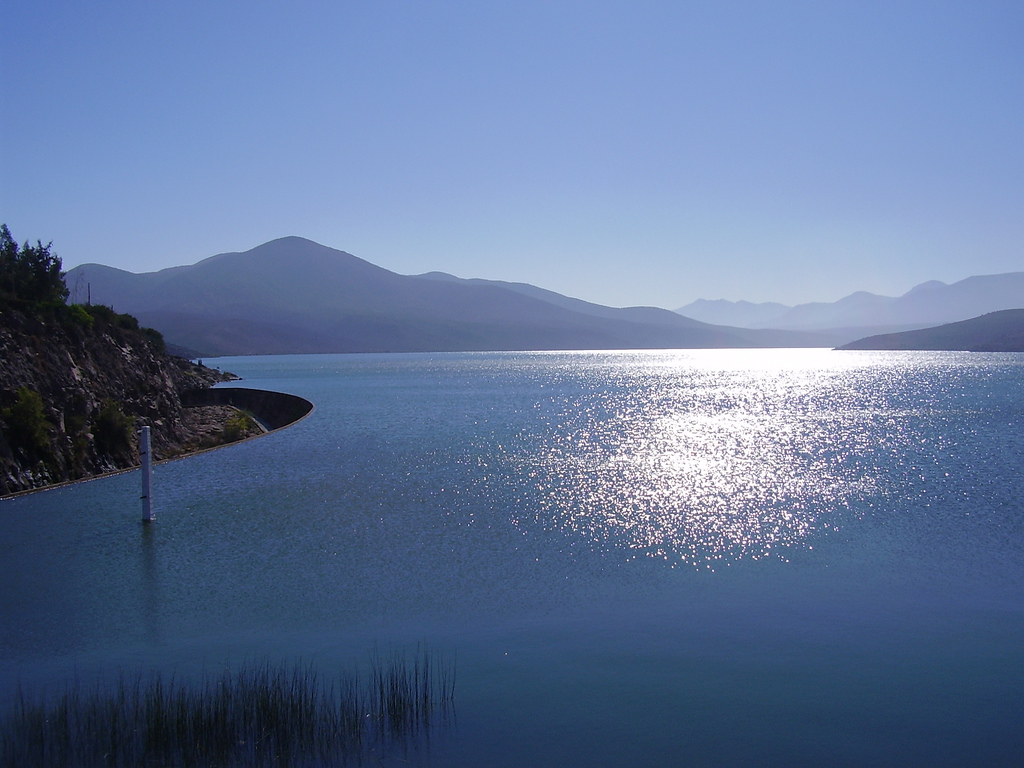
- Río Hurtado

- Location in Chile
- Coordinates: 30°16′S 70°40′W
- Country: Chile
- Region: Coquimbo
- Province: Limarí

Government
  - Type: Municipality
  - Alcalde: Carmen Juana Olivares de la Rivera

Area
  - Total: 2,117.2 km^{2} (817.5 sq mi)
  - Rank: 3
- Elevation: 1,332 m (4,370 ft)

Population (2012 Census)
  - Total: 4,137
  - Rank: 5
  - Density: 1.954/km^{2} (5.061/sq mi)
  - Urban: 0
  - Rural: 4,771

Sex
  - Men: 2,445
  - Women: 2,326
- Time zone: UTC-4 (CLT)
  - Summer (DST): UTC-3 (CLST)
- Area code: 56 + 53
- Website: Municipality of Río Hurtado

Río Hurtado is one of five communes in the Limarí Province of Chile's north-central IV Coquimbo Region.

== Administration ==
As a commune, Río Hurtado is a third-level administrative division of Chile administered by a municipal council, headed by an alcalde who is directly elected every four years.

Within the electoral divisions of Chile, Río Hurtado is represented in the Chamber of Deputies by members elected in the 5th electoral district. The commune is represented in the Senate by members of Parliament elected as part of the 4th senatorial constituency (Coquimbo Region).

== Geography ==
Río Hurtado spans an area of 2,117.2 km^{2} (817 sq mi).

== Demographics ==
According to data from the 2002 Census of Population and Housing, the Río Hurtado commune had 4,771 inhabitants, all of whom are considered to live in rural areas, making it the least populous commune in the province. The Río Hurtado population represents 0.79% of regional population and 3.1% of the provincial population.

== Miscellaneous ==
Rio Hurtado hosts the El Sauce astronomical observatory, and in particular the Chilean station of the Asteroid Terrestrial-impact Last Alert System (ATLAS–CHL, observatory code W68).
