= Limarí Province =

Limarí Province Provincia de Limarí
- Province
- Seal

- Location in the Coquimbo Region

- Location in Chile
- Coordinates: 30°30′S 71°00′W
- Country: Chile
- Region: Coquimbo
- Capital: Ovalle
- Communes: List of 5: Combarbalá; Monte Patria; Punitaqui; Río Hurtado; Ovalle

Government
  - Type: Provincial
  - Presidential Provincial Delegate: Galo Luna Penna (Communist Party)

Area
  - Total: 13,553.2 km^{2} (5,232.9 sq mi)

Population (2012 Census)
  - Total: 161,950
  - Density: 11.949/km^{2} (30.948/sq mi)
  - Urban: 96,239
  - Rural: 59,919

Sex
  - Men: 77,087
  - Women: 79,071
- Time zone: UTC-4 (CLT)
  - Summer (DST): UTC-3 (CLST)
- Area code: 56 +
- Website: Government of Limarí

Limarí Province (Spanish: Provincia de Limarí) is one of three provinces of the Chilean region of Coquimbo Region (IV). Its capital is the city of Ovalle

== Geography and demography ==
According to the 2002 census by the National Statistics Institute (INE), the province spans an area of 13,553.2 km^{2} (5,233 sq mi) and had a population of 156,158 inhabitants (77,087 men and 79,071 women), giving it a population density of 11.5/km^{2} (30/sq mi). Between the 1992 and 2002 censuses, the population grew by 10.3% (14,607 persons).

== Comunas ==
The province is composed by 5 comunas:

- Ovalle
- Río Hurtado
- Monte Patria
- Combarbalá
- Punitaqui

== Limarí Valley wine region ==
The Limarí Valley Denomination of Origin (DO) is defined by the Chilean Appellation system, the legally defined and protected geographical indication used to identify where the grapes for a wine were grown. The valley is located 470 km (290 mi) north of Santiago, in the middle section of the Coquimbo region. Best known for its Piscos, vines were first planted here in the mid-16th century and have seen a recent resurgence, due to new technologies and winemakers seeking new terroirs. The area is known for producing Sauvignon and Chardonnay, first planted during the 1990s, and also produces Syrah and Pinot, with a climate similar to Marlborough in New Zealand. The Pacific Ocean has a strong influence on the region with the cooling Camanchaca, a fog that enters the valley from the west each morning and retreats as the sun rises over the Andes from the east. With less than 4 inches of rainfall per year, drip irrigation is used to water the vines that grow in the mineral-rich soil. The combination creates fresh wines with a distinct mineral edge.

=== Grape distribution by varietal ===
- Climate: Desert-like climate: 95 mm (4 in) of rainfall per year. Semi-arid region with cool coastal influences and good minerality in the soil.
- Soils: clay, silt and chalk.
- Primary grapes: cool-climate Syrah, Chardonnay, Sauvignon Blanc.

Cabernet Sauvignon: 260 ha (643 acres)	Sauvignon Blanc: 168 ha (415 acres)	Carmenere: 93 ha (230 acres)	
Syrah: 291 ha (719 acres)	Merlot: 55 ha (136 acres)	Chardonnay: 23 ha (57 acres)	Pinot Noir: 72 ha (178 acres)

- Total hectares planted: 1,483 ha (3,665 acres).

== See also ==
- Julio Alberto Mercado Illanes
