= Baggaley =

Baggaley may refer to:

- Baggaley, Pennsylvania
- 5136 Baggaley, an asteroid

== People with the name Baggaley ==
- Andrew Baggaley, an English table-tennis player
- Joseph Baggaley, an English trade unionist, based in Canada
- Nathan Baggaley, an Australian canoer
- Ralph Baggaley, an American businessman and financier
