= William H. Peirce =

- Died: 1944
- Occupation: Metallurgist
- Known for: Peirce-Smith converter

William H. Peirce (died 1944) was an American civil engineer and metallurgist, who pioneered copper production in the early 20th century. Among his achievements was the Peirce-Smith converter, invented with Elias Anton Cappelen Smith.

== Life ==
He joined the Baltimore Copper Smelting & Rolling Company in 1890, becoming vice president in 1895, and later, president of the company. Under his management, the company became one of the major copper producer of the United States. In 1928, the company merged with five other copper companies, to create the Revere Copper Company. Described as "one of the foremost metallurgists of his time", Peirce became the vice president, director and a member of the Executive Committee of Revere from its incorporation in 1928 until his resignation in 1933.

== Invention of the Peirce–Smith converter ==
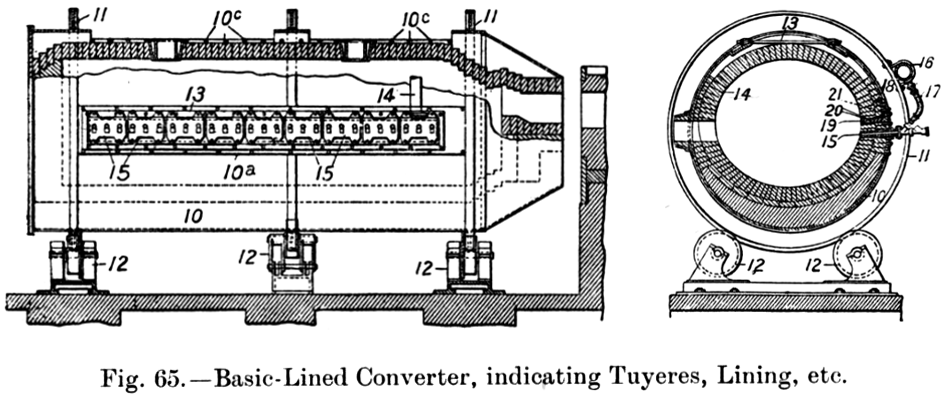
Longitudinal and cross sections of a Peirce–Smith converter

The Peirce–Smith converter, developed in 1908 with Elias Anton Cappelen Smith, significantly improved the converting of copper matte.

Before this invention, the converter was a cylindrical barrel, lined with an acid refractory lining, made of sand and clay. It was developed by two French engineers, Pierre Manhès and Paul David from 1880 to 1884. Their copper-converting process, named the Manhès–David process, was directly derived from the Bessemer process. In this horizontal chemical reactor, where air was injected into copper matte, a molten sulfide material containing iron, sulphur and copper, to become molten blister, an alloy containing 99% copper. But the basic slag produced during the blowing combined with the acid silica refractory lining, thereby causing a very short lifetime of the lining.

By developing a basic refractory material adapted to the matte refining process (in magnesia bricks), Peirce and his engineer Smith found a way to drastically increase the lifetime of the lining. It has been stated that, in some cases, the process allowing an increase from 10 to 2500 tons of copper produced without relining the converters. A reduction of the cost of copper converting from 15–20 USD to 4–5 USD has been stated.

The Peirce-Smith converter quickly replaced the Manhès–David converter: by March 1912, the Peirce-Smith Converting Co claimed that "over 80% of the copper produced in [the U.S.] is being converted either in P-S type converters or on basic lining, under license, in the old acid shells".

It is still in use today, although the process has been significantly improved since then. In 2010, with 250 converters working in the world, the Peirce-Smith converters refine 90% of the copper matte.

== Honors ==
In 1931, Peirce, still president of the Baltimore Copper Smelting & Rolling Co., as well as being President of the Peirce-Smith Converter Company and vice president of the American Smelting & Refining Company, is awarded of the James Douglas medal, for "his numerous improvements in devices for smelting, refining, and rolling copper".
