= John Hollway =

English chemist and inventor (1841–1907)

- Born: November 1841; Barnsbury
- Died: 6 October 1907 (aged 65); London
- Known for: Research and trials preceding Manhès-David process
- Scientific career
- Fields: Metallurgist and chemist
- Workplaces: Sheffield

John M. Hollway (Note: Often written "Holway") (1841 – 1907) was an English metallurgist and chemist who, in the 1870s, unsuccessfully tried out smelting and refining of copper using a converter based on the Bessemer process.

Although his attempts failed, conceding to the French engineers Pierre Manhès and Paul David, the honor of the invention of the Manhès-David process in 1880, the abundant communication he made on his failures constitute a significant contribution to the development and perfecting their process.
