= Manhès–David process =

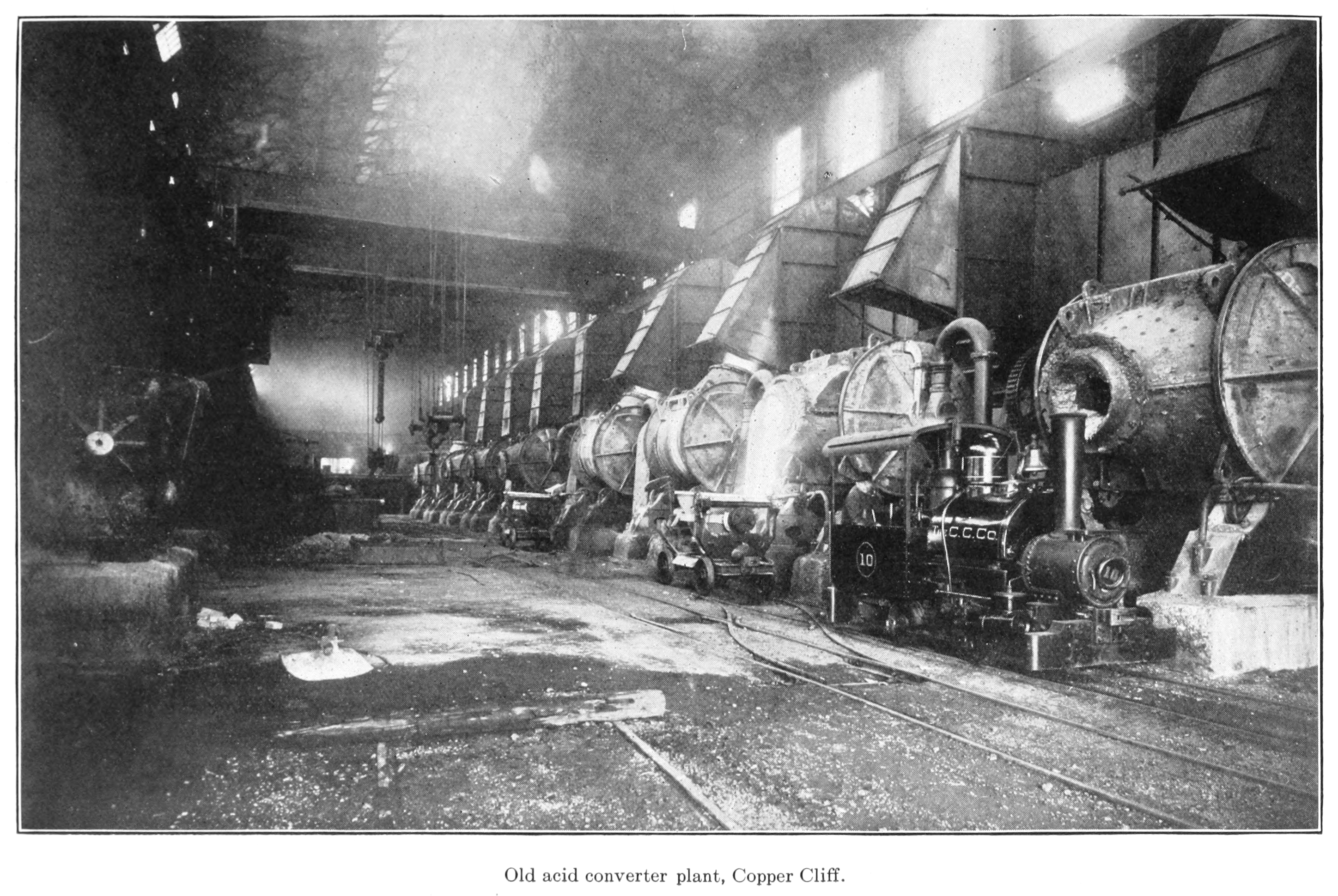
Alignment of 10 Manhès-David converters of the Canadian Copper Company, at Greater Sudbury, before 1911. These converters refined a matte with 36% Ni+Cu, in a matte containing 80% Ni+Cu.

The Manhès–David process is a refining process of the copper mattes, invented in 1880 by the French industrialist Pierre Manhès and his engineer Paul David. Inspired by the Bessemer process, it consists of the use of a converter to oxidise with air the undesirable chemical elements (mainly iron and sulfur) contained in the matte, to transform it into copper.

The quantity of the elements to be oxidized, as well as the low heat produced by the chemical reactions, lead to drastics modifications of the converter. Manhès and David designed it as a horizontal cylinder, with nozzles aligned from one end to the other. A few years later, the Americans engineers William H. Peirce and Elias Anton Cappelen Smith lined it with basic refractory materials, much more durable than that used by the French inventors. While this improvement does not alter the principles of the process, it eases its widespread use, accelerating the switchover of copper production from Britain to the United States.

At the beginning of the 21st century, the Pierce-Smith converters refine 90% of the copper mattes and is used in 60% of the nickel extracted. This converter, like the addition of pure oxygen, the automation of the running, the treatment of smoke and the increasing size of the tools, ensured the durability of the Manhès–David process, even if modern tools have little relationship with their ancestors.

== Origins of the process ==
=== Relationship with the Bessemer process ===
Just as iron produced by a blast furnace comes out alloyed with other chemical elements as cast iron, copper extracted from ore becomes an alloy with sulfur, iron, etc. called matte. To apply the same purification processes to these two metals is therefore logical. Applying the Bessemer process to copper metallurgy was proposed, and the principle validated in 1866, ten years after Henry Bessemer's invention, by the Russian engineer Semenikow.

The refinement of the alloy in the converter is possible because the combustion of undesirable elements is strongly exothermic: the oxidation of silicon and carbon respectively produce 32.8 and 10.3 kilojoules per kilogram. On the other hand, if a copper matte contains an abundance of iron and sulfur, these elements must first be separated (which consumes 6.8 kilojoules per kilogram of FeS) before their oxidation (which only produces 5.9 and 9.1 kJ/kg respectively) can begin.

=== First attempts ===
The first refinements of copper alloys by a converter took place in Ducktown, Tennessee where A. Raht worked on a partial refinement of the matte from 1866 to 1875. In 1867, the Russians Jossa and Latelin tried to experimentally verify the studies of Semenikow. In 1870, they stopped their experiments after only having succeeded to increase the copper content from 31% to 72-80%.

In England, John Hollway continued these trials until 1878. Like his predecessors, he observed that if blowing began in a satisfactory manner, it became more and more intermittent as the refinement progressed. The obstacles he encountered were numerous:

- The weight of produced slag was equal to that of copper and its volume was much greater than that in the converter. It was thus necessary to drain the retort regularly.
- The density of the molten metal changed greatly (with copper having a density three times as great as the pyrite from which it is made).
- The duration of the air blowing, which can reach two hours, involved large thermal losses.
- The siliceous refractory material was absorbed by the slag, in which it acted as flux.

All of the encountered difficulties could not be easily resolved: the thermal heat balance of the refinement reaction in air of copper was not as favorable as for iron, and the matte solidified in the tuyeres before being refined. Even when modified, a Bessemer converter was capable at best of removing iron and a portion of sulfur. Hollway failed, but by publishing all of the details of his experiments, he identified the essential problems.

=== Lateral tuyeres ===
In the 1870s, the French industrialist Pierre Manhès began his first attempts with a small, ordinary Bessemer converter of 50 kg in his factory in Vedène, then in factories in Éguilles, near Avignon. He sought to refine a matte with 25 to 30% copper previously melted in a crucible. But like Hollway, he did not succeed in completely refining the matte. The oxidation of undesirable elements occurred as expected, but the operation was quickly disrupted by the appearance of metallic copper. The matte, which was an ionic compound, was immiscible with the slag, but also with the molten metal. The latter, which is denser (ρ_{copper} ≈ 9), went to the bottom of the converter and clogged the tuyeres.

Pierre Manhès then patented the use of additives whose oxidation would release enough heat to avoid getting stuck. In the end, it was the Frenchman Paul David, then an engineer in his factory in 1880, who suggested the solution. He proposed horizontal tuyeres placed at a sufficient distance from the bottom of the converter so that the copper could gather below them and the air blow constantly in the matte. By 1881, their converter was both technically operational and cost-effective.

In the autumn of 1884, the process was adopted in the United States by the Parrot Silver and Copper Company in Butte, Montana. The two types became larger and larger, increasing from a capacity of one ton to eight tons in 1912, and even fifteen tons for cylindrical converters in 1920.

Diagrams and photos of multiple converter types
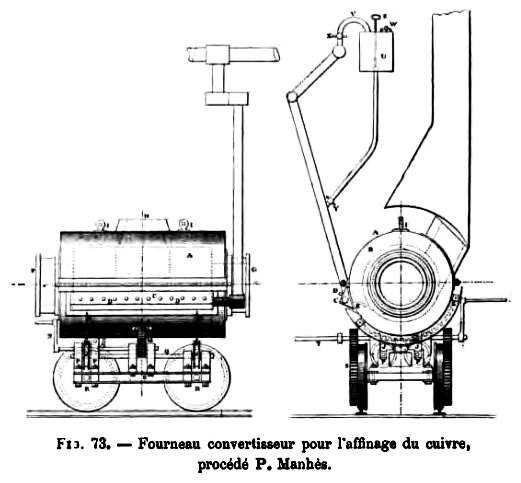
Cylindrical converter, patent by Pierre Manhès.

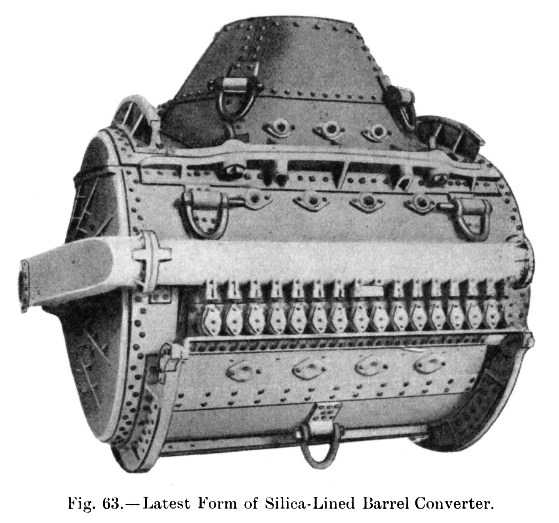
Manhès-David converter known as the barrel form, recognizable by its two domed bottoms, with a capacity of seven tons.

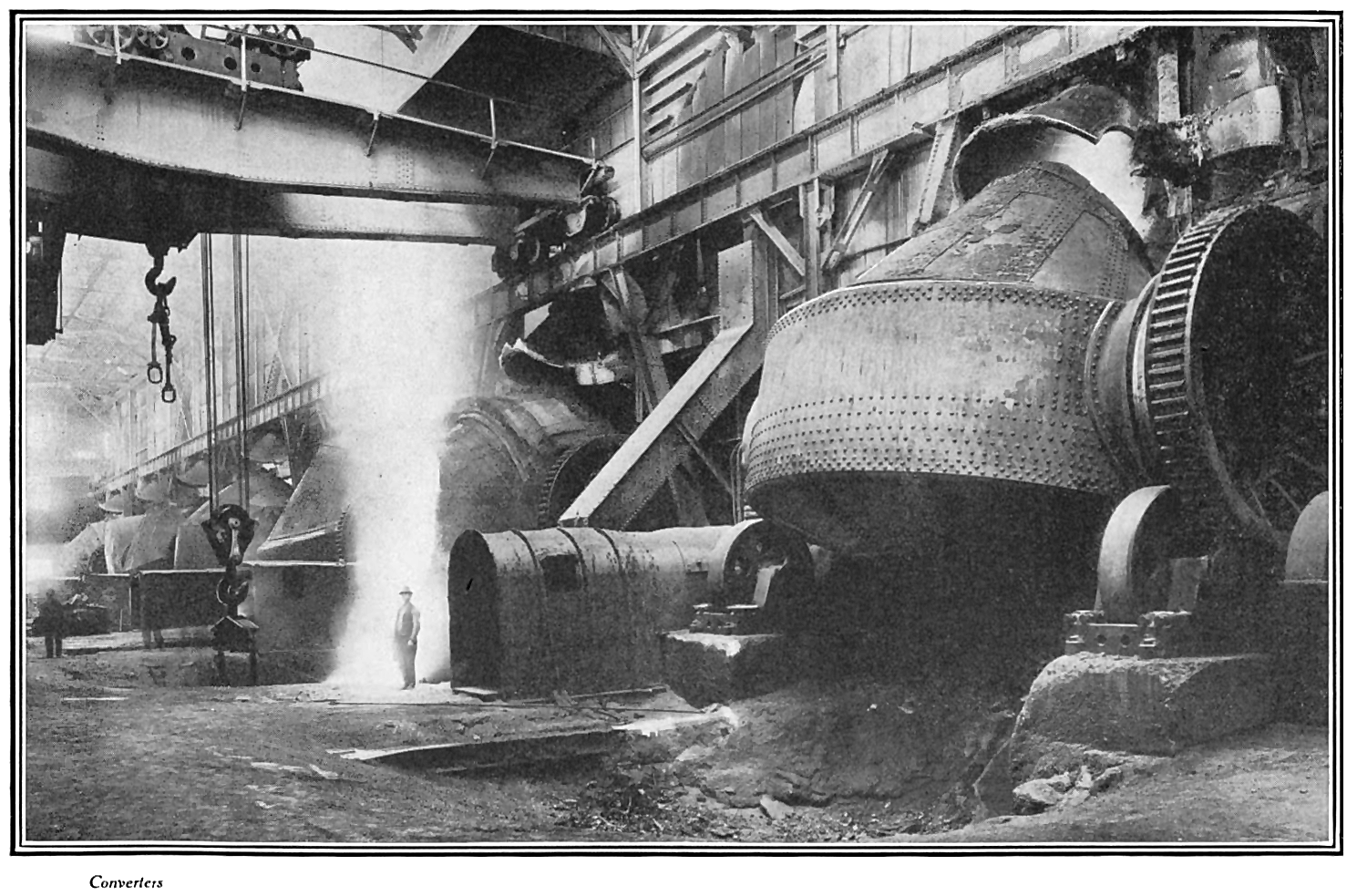
Peirce-Smith converters in the Washoe factory of Anaconda Copper in 1920. The capacity is 65 tons of copper matte, blown in three hours (white metal) + one hour forty-five minutes (blister). The shape of the converter is of the Great Falls type.

=== Improvement by Peirce and Smith ===
As the slag becomes enriched with iron oxide during the reaction in air, it becomes basic and then combines with the siliceous refractory lining, which is very acidic. A basic refractory lining would not react and would therefore lower the cost of production. The adoption of a lining inspired by one developed by Sidney Thomas and Percy Gilchrist in 1877 was suggested by Hollway during his last tests in the early 1800s. However, the idea was not tested, as fundamental problems related to the air blowing were more of a problem than refractory optimization.

In 1890, a basic refractory lining was tested on one of Parrot Smelter's Manhès-David converters, in Butte, under the direction of Herman A. Keller. The tests did not result in a lining compatible with industrial operation. In 1906, Ralph Baggaley, still in Montana, succeeded, after a number of tests, in industrializing a basic coating at Pittsmont Smelter, which was abandoned in 1908 after he left the factory. After all that, the Norwegian Kudsen succeeded as of 1908 in using a basic coating with the Sulitjelma Mines. He carried out two successive blowings there, initially in a small converter with a basic coating, and then in a second traditional converter with an acidic coating.

Finally, in 1909, at the Baltimore Copper Company's Smelter, the Americans William H. Peirce and Elias A.C. Smith succeeded in addressing the main drawbacks of basic refractories; basic refractories were more fragile, and, above all, they dissipated more heat than acidic refractories. By developing a masonry suitable for the cylindrical converter and increasing the amount of metal fed into the furnace, they solved the remaining problems.

Peirce and Smith's converter proved much more advantageous than that of Manhès and David. The basic refractory, which did not react with slag, lasted much longer. This improvement eliminated the need for replacement of the converters, the construction of masonry installations, and replacement converters (there were two masonry converters for every one in service in 1897 at Anaconda Copper). It also reduced the risk of piercings due to poor control of wearing of the refractory. The refractory layer could then be thinner, increasing the capacity of the converter. The capacity was not dependent on wearing of the refractory, thus simplifying the management of the flows of molten metal in factories.

If the material used to prepare the acid refractory contains copper, or even silver or gold (frequently associated with copper in gold-bearing quartz), these metals join the matte as the lining is removed. Considering the refractory's rapid destruction, the economic advantage of an acidic refractory is therefore only realized if its consumption adds value to the process. This situation is however rather rare and, even if this is the case, silica rich in precious metals can be made by other economically viable means. Therefore, in 1921, the basic refractory was considered the main factor in the cost reduction in the extraction of copper ores. In some cases, a reduction in conversion costs from $15–20 to $4–5 was reported.

Diagrams and photos illustrating Peirce-Smith improvements
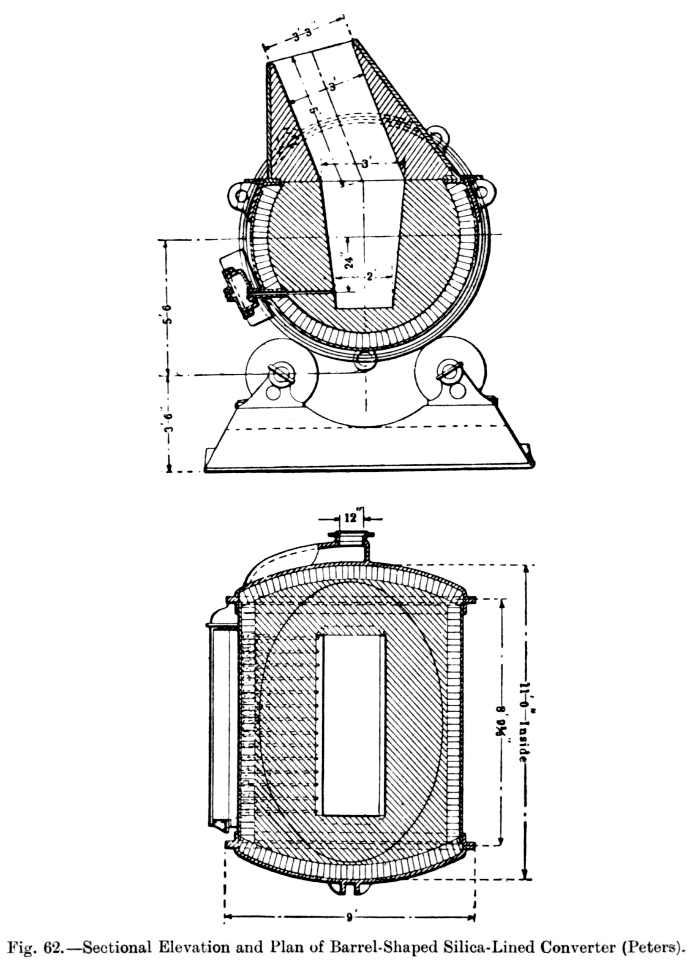
Sections, from above and from the side, of a Manhès-David converter.

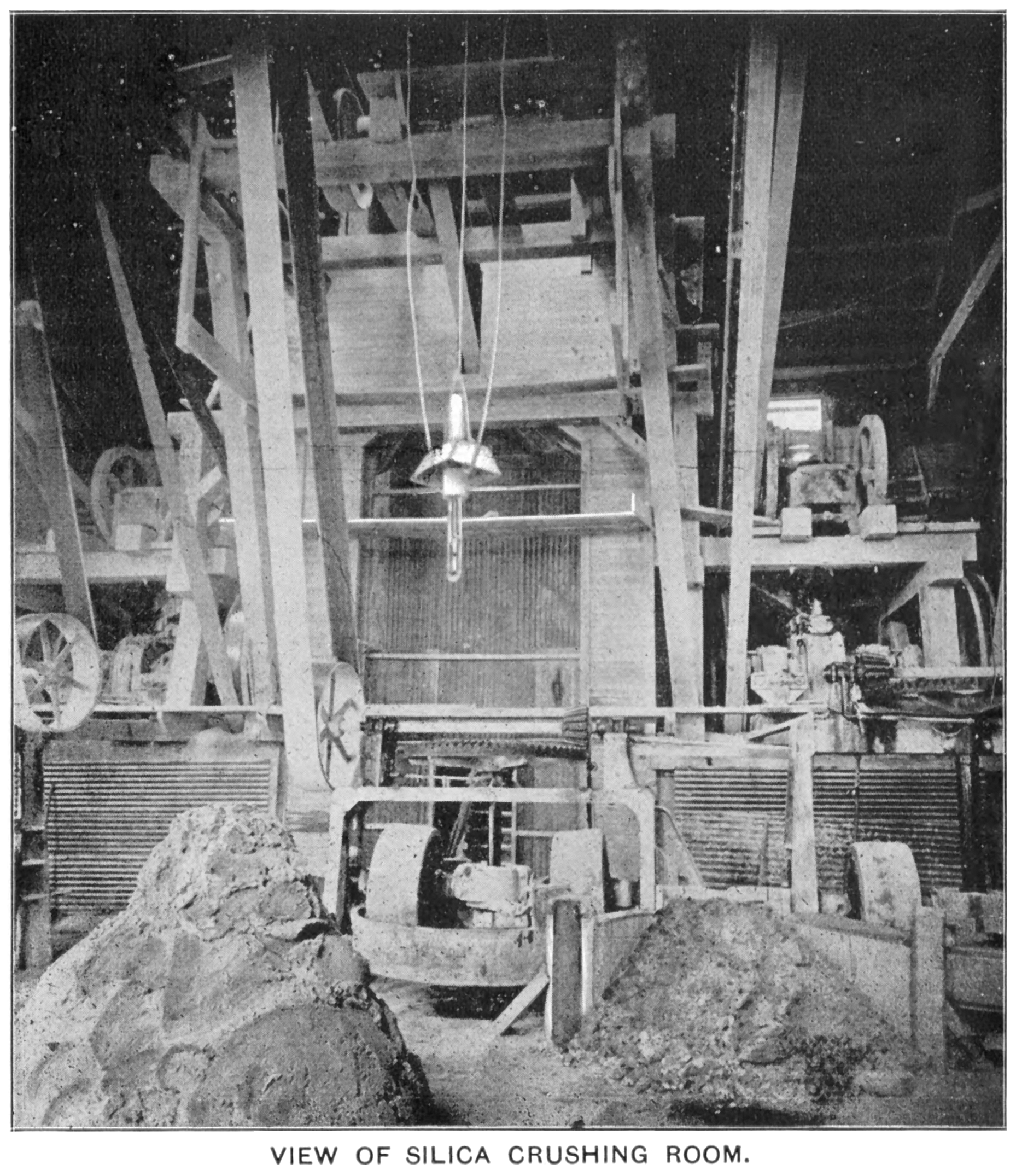
Silica mill for making the refractory lining of Manhès-David converters.

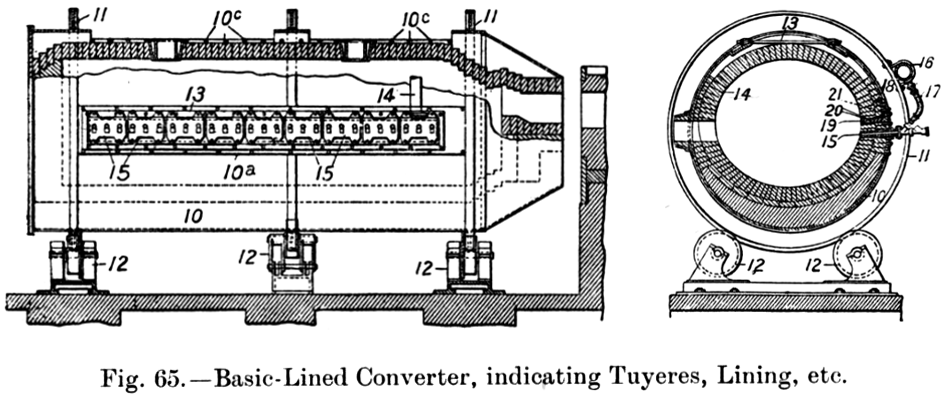
Longitudinal and cross sections of a Peirce-Smith converter.

== Converting in copper metallurgy ==
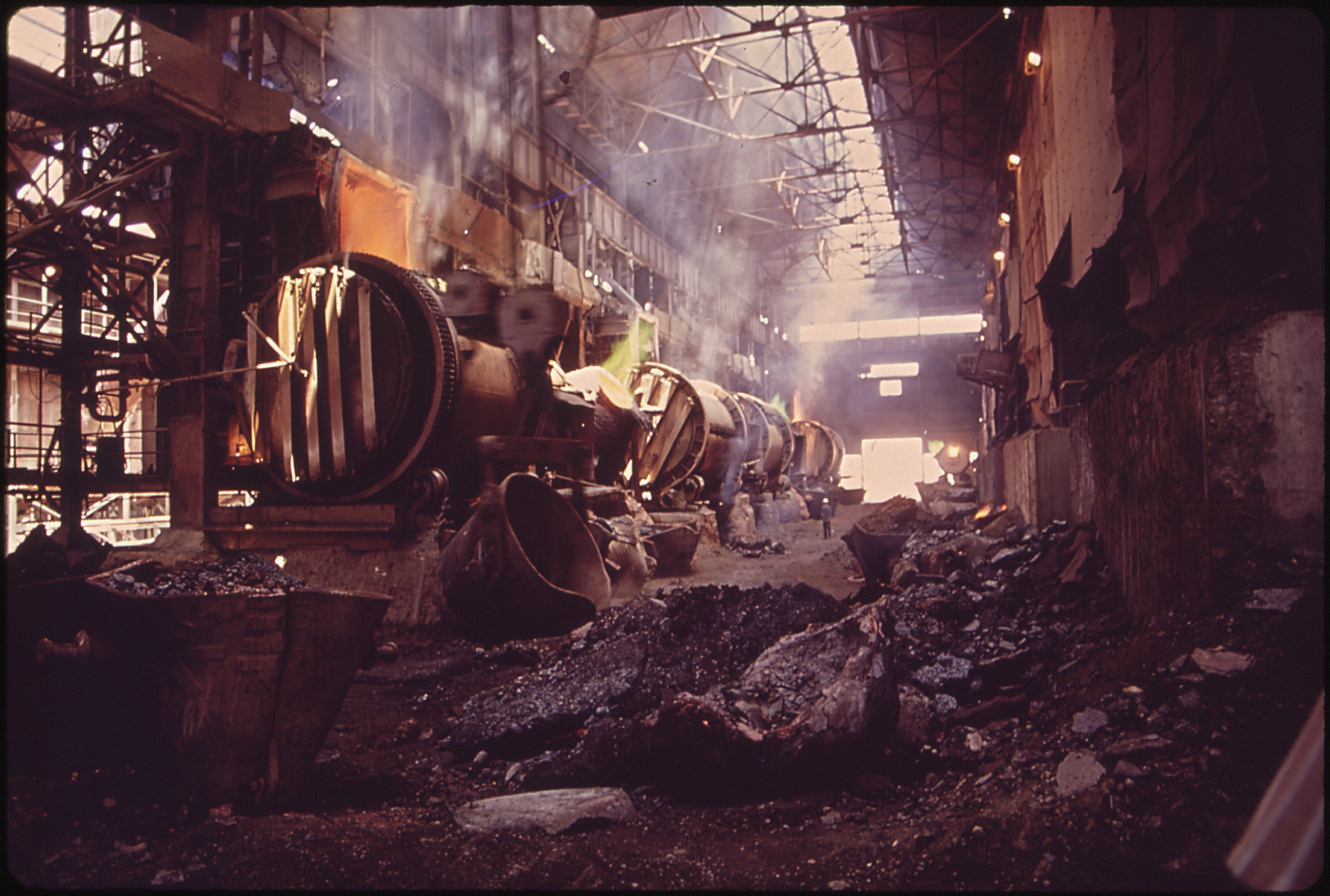
Converters from the Inspiration Consolidated Copper Company in 1972. The second converter is a vertical type. The green flame that comes out of it is characteristic of the combustion of iron(II) sulfide (FeS).

A mixture of copper and iron sulfides referred to as matte is treated in converters to oxidize iron in the first stage, and oxidize copper in the second stage. In the first stage oxygen enriched air is blown through the tuyeres to partially convert metal sulfides to oxides:

FeS + O_{2} → FeO + SO_{2}
CuS + O_{2} → CuO + SO_{2}

Since iron has greater affinity to oxygen, the produced copper oxide reacts with the remaining iron sulfide:

CuO + FeS → CuS + FeO

The bulk of the copper oxide is turned back into the form of sulfide. In order to separate the obtained iron oxide, flux (mainly silica) is added into the converter. Silica reacts with iron oxide to produce a light slag phase, which is poured off through the hood when the converter is tilted around the rotation axis:

2 FeO + SiO_{2} → Fe_{2}SiO_{4} (sometimes denoted as 2FeO•SiO_{2}, fayalite)

After the first portion of slag is poured off the converter, a new portion of matte is added, and the converting operation is repeated many times until the converter is filled with the purified copper sulfide. The converter slag is usually recycled to the smelting stage due to the high content of copper in this by-product. Converter gas contains more than 10% of sulfur dioxide, which is usually captured for the production of sulfuric acid.

The second stage of converting is aimed at oxidizing the copper sulfide phase (purified in the first stage), and produces blister copper. The following reaction takes place in the converter:

CuS + O_{2} → Cu + SO_{2}

Copper content in the obtained blister copper is typically more than 95%. Blister copper is the final product of converting.
