= Elias Anton Cappelen Smith =

Norwegian American engineer and metallurgist (1873–1949)

Elias Anton Cappelen Smith. Photo: E. A. Smith anniversary book.

Elias Anton Cappelen Smith (6 November 1873 – 25 June 1949) was a Norwegian American chemical engineer, civil engineer and metallurgist. He pioneered copper production in the early 20th century. Among his achievements were the Peirce–Smith converter and the Guggenheim process.

== Background ==
Cappelen Smith was born at Trondheim in Sør-Trøndelag, Norway. He was the son of Elias Anton Smith (1842–1912), founder of E.A. Smith AS and Ingeborg Anna Røvig (1846–1923). His middle name Cappelen is from the family of his paternal grandmother, Marie Severine Cappelen (died 1900) married to Peder Høegh Smith (died 1881). He grew up as the eldest son among nine children and attended the Trondheim Cathedral School. He was educated as a chemist at Trondhjems Tekniske Læreanstalt, now the Norwegian University of Science and Technology, taking his final exam in 1893. The same year he emigrated to the United States.

== Career ==
Cappelen Smith started working as an assistant chemist at Armour and Company in Chicago in 1893. Cappelen Smith was employed in the metallurgical industry working from 1895 to 1896 for the Chicago Copper Refining Company, from 1896 to 1900 for the Anaconda Copper Mining Company, and from 1901 to 1910 as the head metallurgist for the Baltimore Copper Smelting and Rolling Company in Perth Amboy, New Jersey. It was while at this company that he and William H. Peirce developed the Peirce-Smith converter, which revolutionized the Manhès-David process.

Cappelen Smith died in New York in 1949.

== Peirce–Smith converter ==
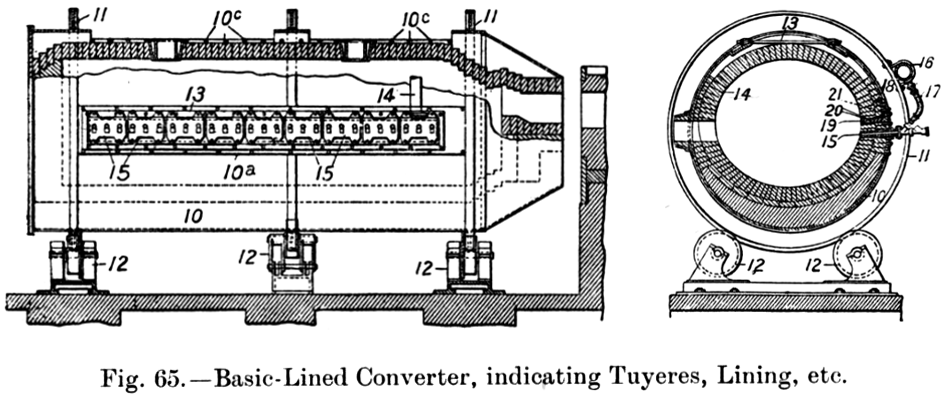
Longitudinal and cross sections of a Peirce–Smith converter.

The Peirce–Smith converter, introduced in 1908, improved significantly the copper converting process. Before this improvement, the converter was a long cylindrical vessel, lined with sand and clay. It was developed by two French engineers, Pierre Manhès and Paul David from 1880 to 1884. Their copper-converting process, named the Manhès-David process, was directly derived from the Bessemer process. In this horizontal chemical reactor, where air was injected into copper matte, a molten sulfide material containing iron, sulphur and copper, would become molten blister, an alloy containing 99% copper. But the basic slag produced during the blowing, combined with the acid silica refractory lining, meant that the converter linings had a very short lifetime.

By developing a basic refractory material adapted to the matte refining process (in magnesia bricks), Cappelen Smith and William H. Peirce found a way to drastically increase the lifetime of the lining. It has been stated that, in some cases, the process allowing an increase from 10 to 2500 tons of copper produced without relining the converters. A reduction of the cost of copper converting from 15 to US$20 to 4–5 USD has been stated.

The Peirce–Smith converter replaced quickly the Manhès-David Converter: by March 1912, the Peirce–Smith Converting Co. claimed that "over 80% of the copper produced in [the U.S.] is being converted either in P-S type converters or on basic lining, under license, in the old acid shells".

It is still in use today, although the process has been significantly improved since then. In 2010, with 250 converters working in the world, the Peirce–Smith converters refine 90% of the copper matte.

== Guggenheim process ==
The Guggenheim process is a method of chemical precipitation which employs ferric chloride and aeration to prepare sludge for filtration. Cappelen Smith improved the leaching technology and applied it to the low grade copper ore deposits of the Guggenheim family mining interests in the Chuquicamata open pit copper mine in the north of Chile. The Guggenheim process first the exploitation of poor quality copper ore in the Chuquicamata mine starting in 1915. This mine is still today one of the world's largest copper resources.

== Honors ==
In 1920 Cappelen Smith was honored with the gold medal of the Mining and Metallurgical Society of America for distinguished service in the art of hydrometallurgy. In 1925, he was made a commander 1st Class in the Royal Norwegian Order of St. Olav. He was made a member of the Royal Norwegian Scientific Society during 1926. He was also commander of the Chilean Al Merito-order and was awarded an honorary doctorate at Drexel Institute of Technology. In 1930, Cappelen Smith helped finance the installation of the Steinmeyer organ in the Nidaros Cathedral for the 900th anniversary of the Battle of Stiklestad. (Norwegian:Olavsjubileet 1930th)

The town and commune María Elena in north Chile was named after his wife Mary Ellen Comdon.

== Primary Source ==
- Bjork, Kenneth (1947), Saga in Steel and Concrete: Norwegian Engineers in America, Norwegian-American Historical Association

Saga in Steel and Concrete is posted in sections at: Norway-L archives 2003-04 Norway-L archives 2003-05
