= E. A. Smith =

E. A. Smith may refer to:

- E. A. Smith (company), Norwegian trading company
- E. A. Smith (historian), English historian
- Edgar Albert Smith (1847–1916), British malacologist and zoologist
- Eugene Allen Smith (1841–1927), geologist from the USA
- Effie Anderson Smith (1869-1955), Impressionist painter active mostly in Arizona, USA

== See also ==
- List of people with surname Smith#E
