= Reinertsen (surname) =

Reinertsen is a surname. Notable people with the surname include:

- Emma May Alexander Reinertsen (1853–1920), American writer, social reformer
- Espen Reinertsen (born 1979), Norwegian saxophonist, flutist, composer, and music producer
- Jon Reinertsen (born 1946), Norwegian handball player
- Sarah Reinertsen (born 1975), American paratriathlete
- Stein Reinertsen (born 1960), Norwegian Lutheran bishop
- Terje Reinertsen (born 1987), Norwegian footballer
- Trond Reinertsen (born 1945), Norwegian economist and businessman
