= William Kelly (inventor) =

American businessman

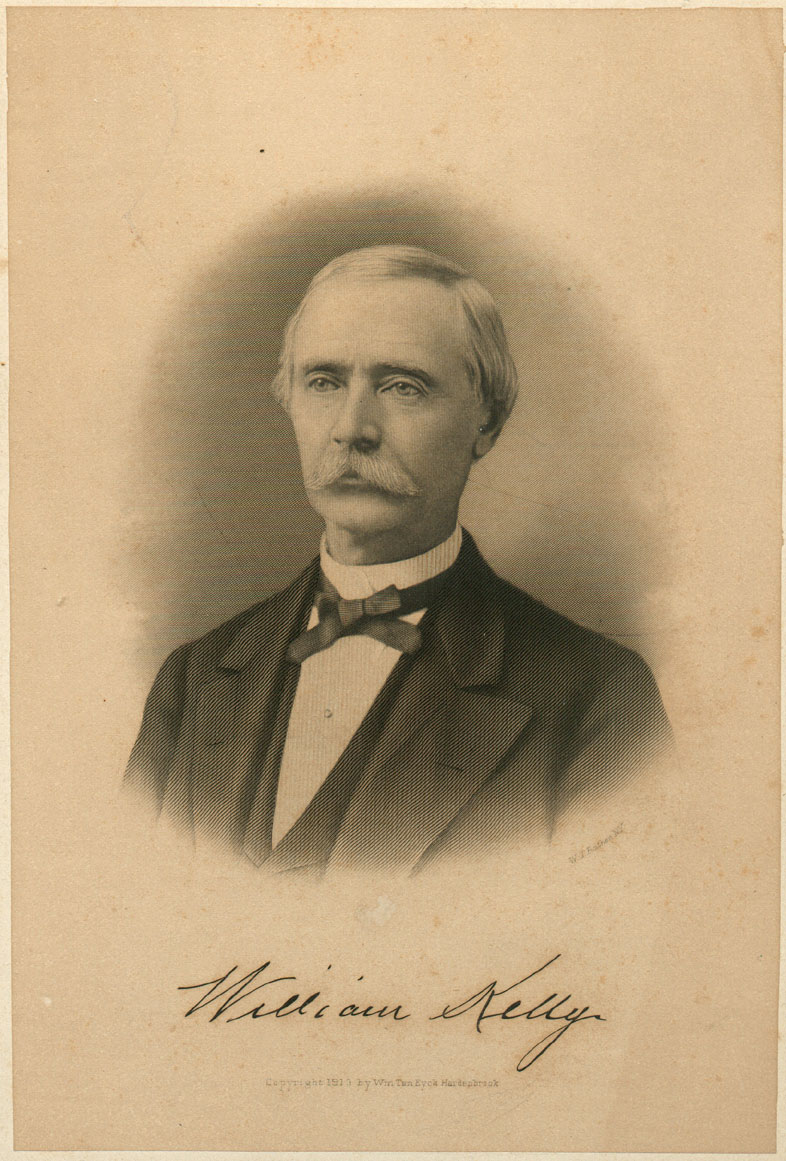
William Kelly, Inventor

William Kelly (August 21, 1811 – February 11, 1888), born in Pittsburgh, Pennsylvania, was an American inventor. He is credited with being one of the inventors of modern steel production, through the process of injecting air into molten iron, which he experimented with in the early 1850s. A similar process was discovered independently by Henry Bessemer and patented in 1855. Due to a financial panic in 1857, a company that had already licensed the Bessemer process was able to purchase Kelly's patents, and licensed both under a single scheme using the Bessemer name. Kelly's role in the invention of the process is much less known.

== Early life ==
Kelly studied metallurgy at the Western University of Pennsylvania. Instead of getting a job as a scientist, Kelly, his brother, and his brother-in-law started a dry goods and commission business, which they called McShane & Kelly. After a fire destroyed their warehouse, William and his brother John decided to move to Eddyville, Kentucky in 1847 to enter the iron industry.

== Iron and steel making ==
In 1846, they purchased an iron manufacturing company in Lyon County on the Cumberland River, called Eddyville iron-work. They then renamed the factory Kelly & Company.

=== Traditional methods ===
Before the technique of injecting air into molten iron was re-discovered by Kelly and Bessemer, iron was available as cast iron, a strong but brittle metal made in a blast furnace by treating iron ore with coke derived from coal, and wrought iron, a more malleable and flexible metal made by heating iron ore in a low oxygen environment in a bloomery heated by charcoal and producing "blooms", which were 100 to 200-pound lumps of very low carbon iron mixed with slag. The blooms then had to be worked repeatedly by hammering with a helve hammer or later a steam hammer and folding it to work out the slag. This could in turn be converted to steel by heating it for prolonged periods sealed in stone boxes with charcoal, to add back carbon. The resulting steel could then be formed into larger shapes by heating it to welding temperature and hammering it together into a mass. Other laborious and expensive methods made small amounts of steel from special ores.

=== Improvements by Kelly and Bessemer ===
Kelly started experimenting with his "air-boiling process," a process of blowing air up through molten iron to reduce the carbon content, in the 1850s. His initial goal was to reduce the amount of fuel required for iron and steel making, because of the immense amount of timber required to make the charcoal. He discovered that the injected air did not cool the molten iron, but instead combined with the carbon to cause the iron to boil and burn violently until the carbon was greatly reduced, improving the quality of the iron or converting it to steel. His iron workers may have contributed to his discovery. According to Kelly's biography, in 1854 he hired Chinese iron workers through a New York teahouse. Historian of metallurgy Donald Wagner notes that a similar process was already extant in China, and that Kelly's Chinese iron workers were likely familiar with how molten cast iron behaved under an air blast. The engineer William Phillips, after a trip to Eddyville, wrote in 1899 that "the Chinese had refined iron by blowing air into it a great many years ago, and I have thought that Kelly, in asking for Chinese laborers, would naturally require the services of those who had some knowledge of the iron business."

A similar process was later independently invented and patented by Henry Bessemer in 1856. Kelly was college-educated in metallurgy, while Bessemer in his autobiography described no education, other than a practical knowledge of typecasting and machining learned at his father's type foundry, stating in 1854, "My knowledge of iron metallurgy was at that time very limited...", but somehow he was able to build, without a long series of progressive improvements, a functioning converter to blow air into molten iron and convert it to steel. However, Bessemer was a renowned inventor of many industrial processes before he invented the Bessemer process and the potential of blowing air through iron had long been known about before either Bessemer or Kelly applied for a patent, such as in the finery process and in experiments undertaken in the 1840s by James Nasmyth. In September 1856, Bessemer's patent was reported by Scientific American. Kelly wrote a letter to the magazine in October 1856 describing his earlier experiments and asserted that the English workmen at his plant had informed Bessemer of Kelly's experiments. Kelly writes, "I have reason to believe my discovery was known in England three or four years ago, as a number of English puddlers visited this place to see my new process. Several of them have since returned to England and may have spoken of my invention there." Kelly's son would later make the unsubstantiated allegation that Bessemer had personally visited Eddyville to secretly learn from Kelly's experiments.

=== Gallery ===
Various types of converter are shown. An original Kelly Converter was displayed outside the general offices of Bethlehem Steel Corporation on Walnut St., in Johnstown, Pennsylvania for many years until it was relocated to the Smithsonian Institution in Washington, D.C. A photograph of it is available at this link: http://explorepahistory.com/displayimage.php?imgId=1-2-9E0

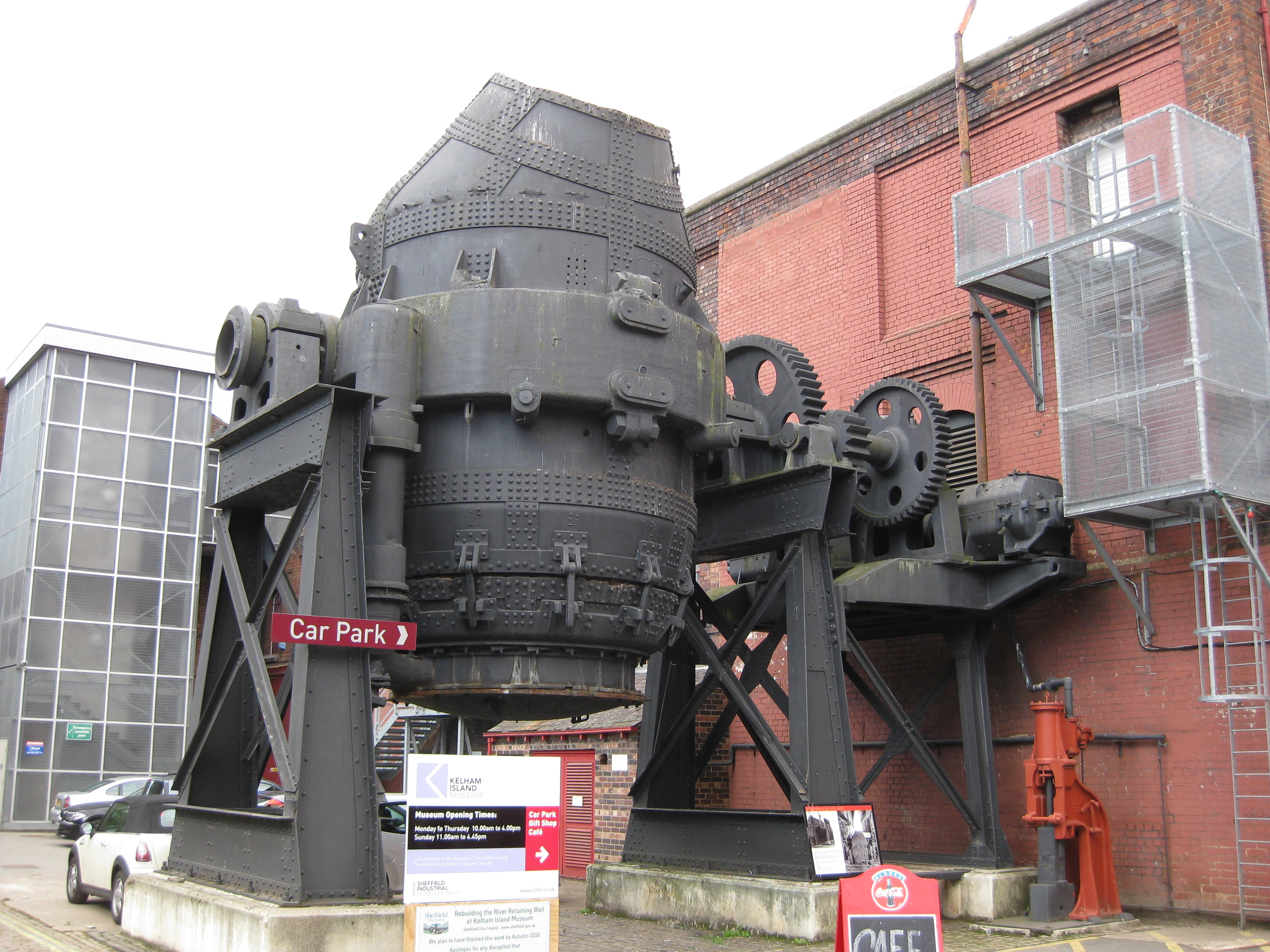
Bessemer converter

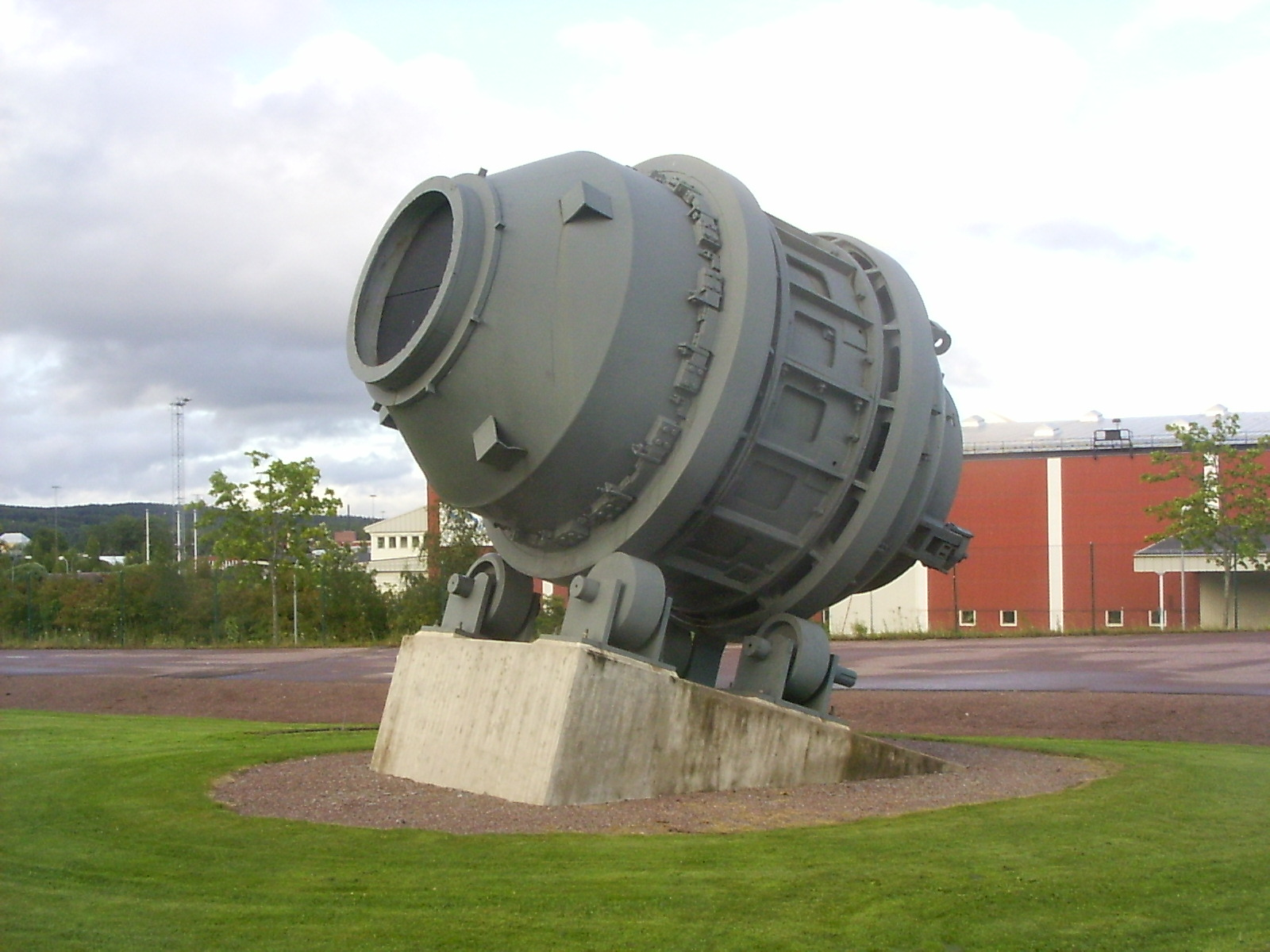
Kaldo converter

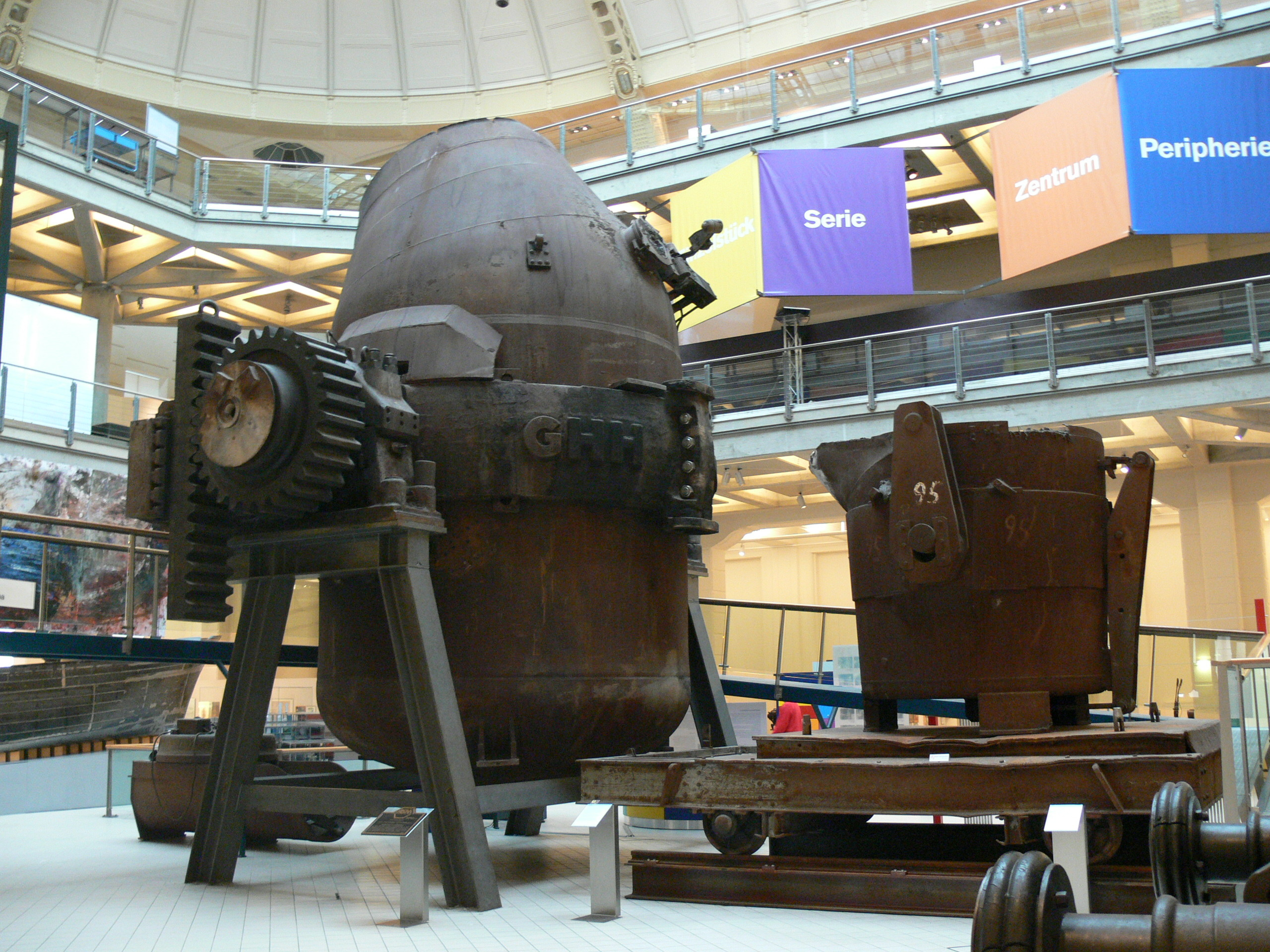
LD converter

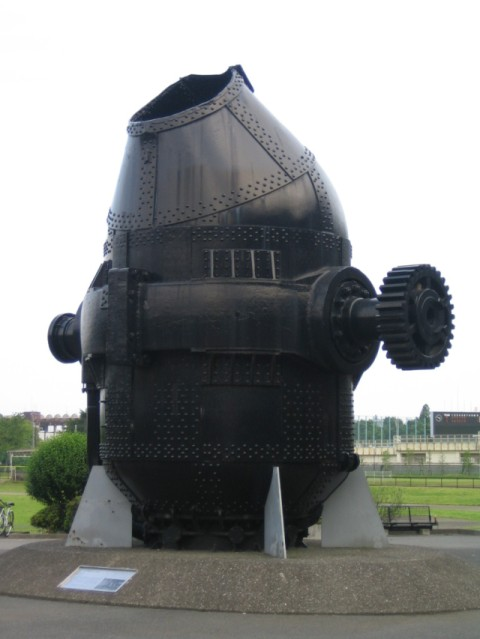
Thomas converter

=== Kelly's patent ===
Kelly applied for a patent after Bessemer patented the process, and was granted patent U.S. patent 17,628 in 1857. The core claim of his patent was "Blowing blasts of air, either hot or cold, up and through a mass of liquid iron, the oxygen in the air combining with the carbon in the iron, causing a greatly increased heat and boiling commotion in the fluid mass and decarbonizing and refining the iron."

=== Renewal of patent ===
In 1871, the U.S. Patent Office granted Kelly a renewal of his patent for 7 years while rejecting applications for renewal by Bessemer and Robert Forester Mushet, who had also received patents for the process. Bessemer's renewal was rejected for the sole reason that his British patent with which it had been made co-terminal had duly expired at the end of its 14 years of life, and it would have been inequitable to give Bessemer protection in the United States while British iron-masters were not under similar restraint. Had it not been for this consideration, Bessemer probably would have been granted a renewal.

=== Kelly's bankruptcy ===
The financial panic of 1857 resulted in Kelly's bankruptcy, and he was forced to sell his patent. The Kelly patent and the Bessemer patent were licensed for steelmaking in Pennsylvania, at the Cambria Iron Works, starting in 1857. With the patents jointly licensed, invention priority disputes became of little interest to the business world. Kelly received only about 5% of the patent royalties paid to Bessemer, and Bessemer's name was used for the process. Bessemer already had a well known steel making operation in England, and Kelly was little known.

=== Bessemer Steel ===
The companies owning the Kelly and Bessemer patents began selling the product under the name "Bessemer Steel" in 1866. The Bessemer process greatly reduced the cost of steel and improved the quality, making possible the industrial growth of the United States from 1865 until the early 1900s. The Bessemer process was replaced by the open-hearth process in the early 20th century.

== Kelly's later life ==
Kelly worked in Louisville, Kentucky for the rest of his life, manufacturing axes as well as working in real estate and banking. He died there February 11, 1888.
