= E. A. Smith (company) =

Norwegian trading company

E. A. Smith AS is a Norwegian trading company which owns other companies in the Smith Group (Smith-gruppen). It has its headquarters in Trondheim. It owns Bygger'n, a nationwide building materials chain of approximately 100 stores.

The firm was founded in 1869 by wholesaler Elias Anton Smith (1842–1912). One of the sons of Elias Anton Smith was Norwegian American, chemical engineer Elias Anton Cappelen Smith who was a partner in Guggenheim Brothers of New York City, and gave large donations to Norway.

From the start, the company dealt with trade on iron and hardware, oil and derivatives, as well as cement and coal. These products would be the company's main interest in the following years. Elias Anton Smith's company flourished, and became well known both by the town's public, and in the larger districts of Trøndelag and Northern Norway.

The Smith group is today established in large parts of the country, and is Norway's only complete supplier of steel, metals, building materials, lumber, reinforcement and tools with customer service and logistics. The headquarters are in Trondheim, where E. A. Smith AS deals with central finance, accounting and IT services for the whole Smith group. It is today one of the country's oldest active trading companies. The company is still owned by descendants of Elias Anton Smith, with Trond Reinertsen as President.
