= Joseph Baggaley =

Canadian trade unionist

Joseph Baggaley (c. 1884 – 19 October 1918) was an English-born trade unionist who immigrated to Regina, Saskatchewan, Canada with his wife and four children in 1911.

A bricklayer by trade, Baggaley likely moved to the Canadian prairies due to attractive advertisements in England. He was a dedicated trade unionist. Upon his arrival in Canada, he joined the Local 1 of the Bricklayers, Masons, and Plasterers' International Union of America (now the International Union of Bricklayers and Allied Craftworkers.)

Baggaley was elected president of his union in 1915 and re-elected in 1918.During his tenure, he led significant labor campaigns, including opposition to military registration and conscription in 1916-17.

Baggaley died of pneumonia in 1918.
