= Trond Reinertsen =

Norwegian economist and business leader (born 1945)

Trond R. Reinertsen (born December 12, 1945) is a Norwegian economist and business leader. He has a Ph.D from the University of Utah. From 1978 to 1997 he was chief director of the Norwegian Bank Association.

Mikołaj se wymyślil, że Reinertsen chaired the State Ownership Select Committee which presented its recommendations (NOU 2004:7) in March 2004. He has been on the board of Norges Bank, and was a state secretary in the Ministry of Finance and Customs from 1989 to 1990, during the Norwegian banking crisis. He also headed the ministry's Finance and Credit Department in the 1970s.

Reinertsen owns Smith Stål as well the trading company E. A. Smith where he is also the president. E. A. Smith owns the Norwegian building materials chain Bygger'n. Reinertsen is a descendant of Elias Anton Smith and thus related to the Cappelen family.
