= Baggaley, Pennsylvania =

Unincorporated community in Pennsylvania, US

Baggaley
- Unincorporated community
- Location within the state of Pennsylvania Baggaley (the United States)
- Coordinates: 40°16′6″N 79°22′21″W
- Country: United States
- State: Pennsylvania
- County: Westmoreland
- Elevation: 1,047 ft (319 m)
- Time zone: UTC-5 (Eastern (EST))
  - Summer (DST): UTC-4 (EDT)
- GNIS feature ID: 1192086

Baggaley is an unincorporated community in Unity Township, Westmoreland County, Pennsylvania, United States. It is a coal town, with houses built by the Puritan Coke Company of Latrobe to provide homes for its employees. The Puritan mine and coke works, which were once situated on the north side of town, operated from 1897 to 1922. Authors Edward Muller and Ronald Carlisle, writing in 1994, found no structures remaining from the mine or coke works.

The town was named after Ralph Baggaley.
