= Pierre Manhès =

- Born: 22 July 1841; Lyon
- Died: 4 February 1906 (aged 64); Nantua
- Known for: Manhès-David process
- Scientific career
- Fields: Copper extraction techniques
- Institutions: Éguilles

Pierre Manhès (1841 – 1906) was a French metallurgist and businessman, who succeeded in 1880 to adapt the Bessemer process to the pyrometallurgy of the copper. With his engineer Paul David (metallurgist), he developed the Manhès-David process and converter, which were widely adopted, mainly in the United States.

In 1883, under license to use the patented process Franklin Farrel introduced the Manhes-David furnace at the Parrot smelter in Butte, Montana. Its successful adoption was followed by Anaconda at Butte, Copper Queen at Bisbee, Arizona, United Verde, Jerome, Arizona, and other plants by the 1890s. Before the adoption of the process, copper mines in the Western United States produced only matte, which required further, costly purification steps in east coast refineries. The Manhes-David step increased the purity of copper metal produced at the Western mine site, up to 99%, and more with the addition of the electrolysis process by the end of the century. The growing electrical needs for refined copper and its better conductivity was met by the purer metal now (ca. 1900) coming from the mines.

Nowadays, in the beginning of the XXI, Manhès-David process is still in use, to refine 90% of the copper mattes, and 60% of the nickel extracted in the world. But his silica-lined converter has been superseded by the improved Peirce-Smith converter
