= Ralph Baggaley =

American businessman (1846–1915)

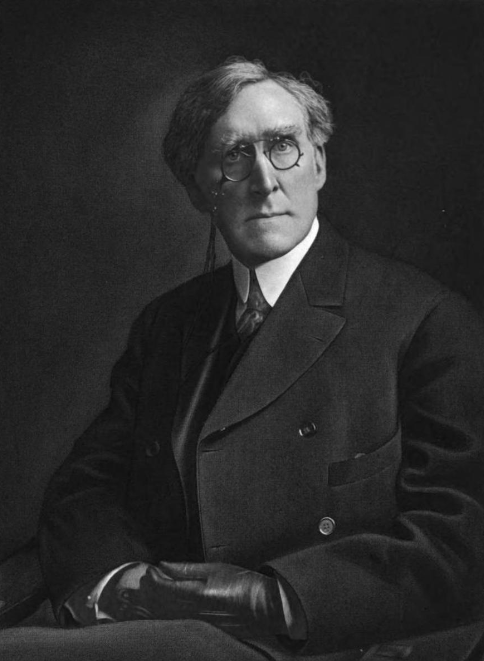
- Born: December 26, 1846; Allegheny, Pennsylvania, U.S.
- Died: September 23, 1915 (aged 68); Pittsburgh, Pennsylvania, U.S.

Ralph Baggaley (December 26, 1846 – September 23, 1915) was an American businessman and financier who engaged in multiple business ventures throughout his career, most notably in his role as vice-president of the Westinghouse Air Brake Company.

== Early life ==
Ralph Baggaley was born to William (1811–1877) and Elizabeth (nee Blair) Bagaley (1819–1848) (Note: The original spelling of Baggaley contained two g's, one of which was dropped by William and reintroduced by Ralph in 1893) on December 26, 1846 in Allegheny City, Pennsylvania. Growing up, he attended both the Sewickley Academy and later the Kenwood Academy in New Brighton, Pennsylvania. During the beginning of the American Civil War, Baggaley was sent to Dresden, Germany where he attended a private school. He returned to the United States after three years due to the death of his father.

== Professional life ==
Upon Baggaley's return to Pittsburgh, he worked at Bollman & Company to familiarize himself with the foundry business. He purchased large interests in the company and later assumed its management, changing the name to Baggaley, Young & Company. In 1868, he met and began a relationship with George Westinghouse who had recently invented the railway air brake for train cars. By now, Baggaley's foundry, one of the largest in the city, allowed him to financially back Westinghouse's invention and create a prototype for testing. These began manufacturing in Pittsburgh in 1869, and Baggaley was named the head of the Westinghouse Machine Company. He would soon become instrumental in marketing the invention to the rest of America and bring it to Europe. When the Westinghouse Air Brake Company was created three months later, Baggaley was named vice-president.

During the Panic of 1873, Baggaley purchased 27,000 acres of iron property near Lake Superior. These lands proved to be a valuable source of iron and were later sold to the United States Steel Corporation.

== Personal life ==
Baggaley married twice. His first marriage was to Mary A. “Harriet” Arthurs (1854–1890). After her death, married a second time on June 11, 1896 to Effie King Irwin (1871–1936).

Children with Arthurs:

- Mary E. (1879–1934)
- Elizabeth (1881–1932)
- Annabel Whitney (1885–1971)
- William B.

Children with Irwin:

- Euphemia Ann (1897–1949)
- Ralph Jr. (1900–1988)

== Legacy ==
The coal town of Baggaley, Pennsylvania was named after him.
