= Bessemer process =

Steel production method

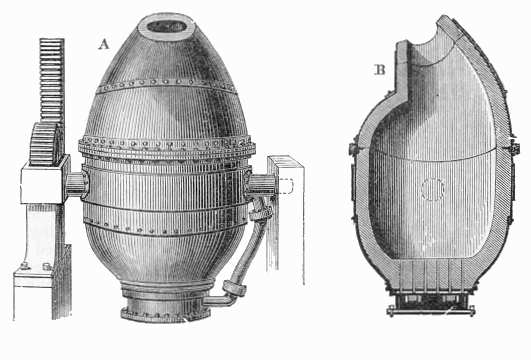
Bessemer converter, schematic diagram

The Bessemer process was the first inexpensive industrial process for the mass production of steel from molten pig iron before the development of the open hearth furnace. The key principle is removal of impurities and undesired elements, primarily excess carbon, contained in the pig iron by oxidation with air being blown through the molten iron. Oxidation of the excess carbon also raises the temperature of the iron mass and keeps it molten. As virtually all the pig iron carbon is removed by the converter, carbon must be added at the end of the process to create steel. 0.25% carbon content is a typical value for low-carbon steel which is used in construction and other low-stress applications.

The modern process is named after its inventor, the Englishman Henry Bessemer, who took out a patent on the process in 1856. The process was said to have been discovered independently in 1851 by the American inventor William Kelly, though the claim is controversial.

The process using a basic refractory lining is known as the "basic Bessemer process" or Gilchrist–Thomas process after the English discoverers Percy Gilchrist and Sidney Gilchrist Thomas.

== History ==
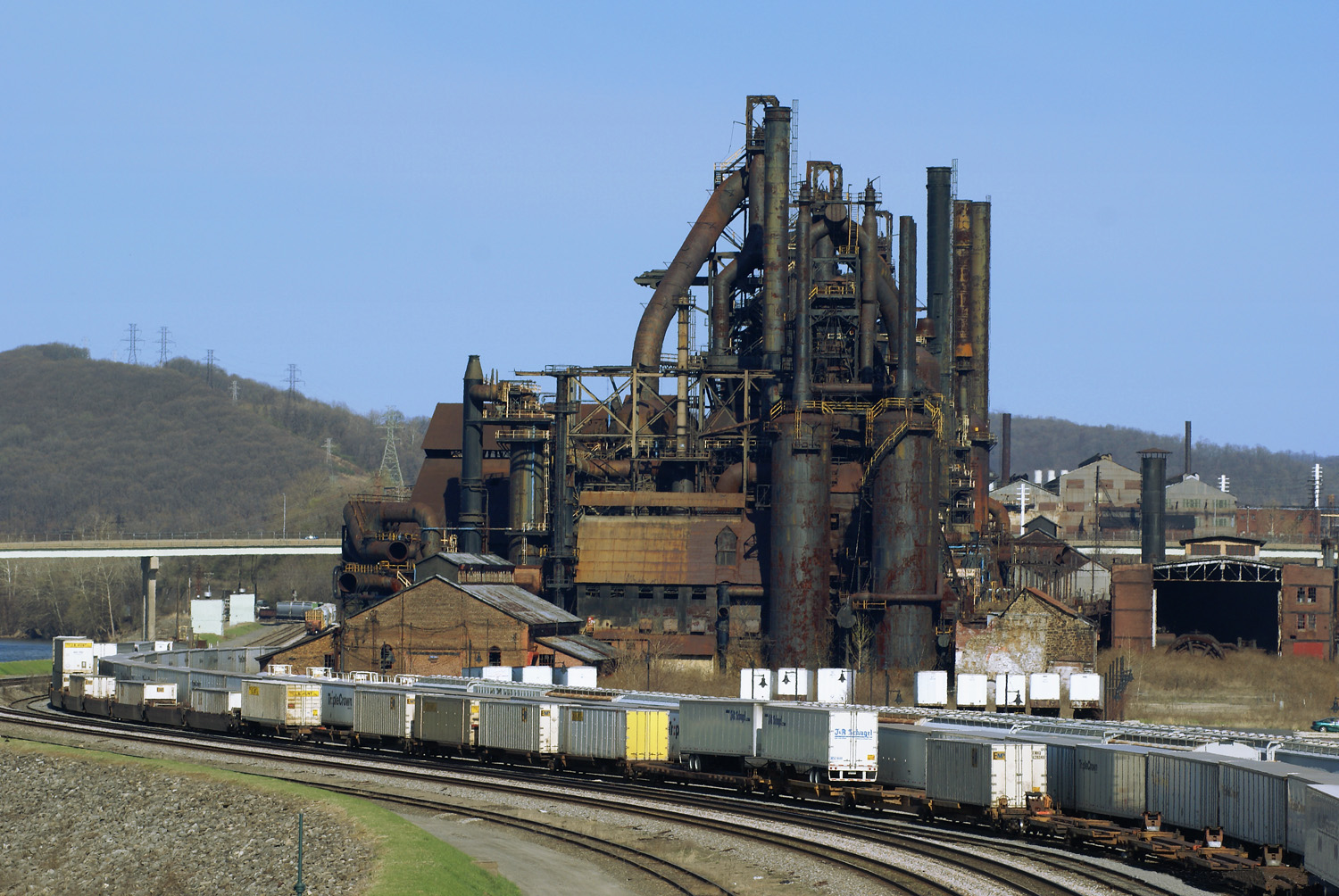
Bethlehem Steel in Bethlehem, Pennsylvania, was one of the world's largest manufacturers of steel before its 2003 closure.

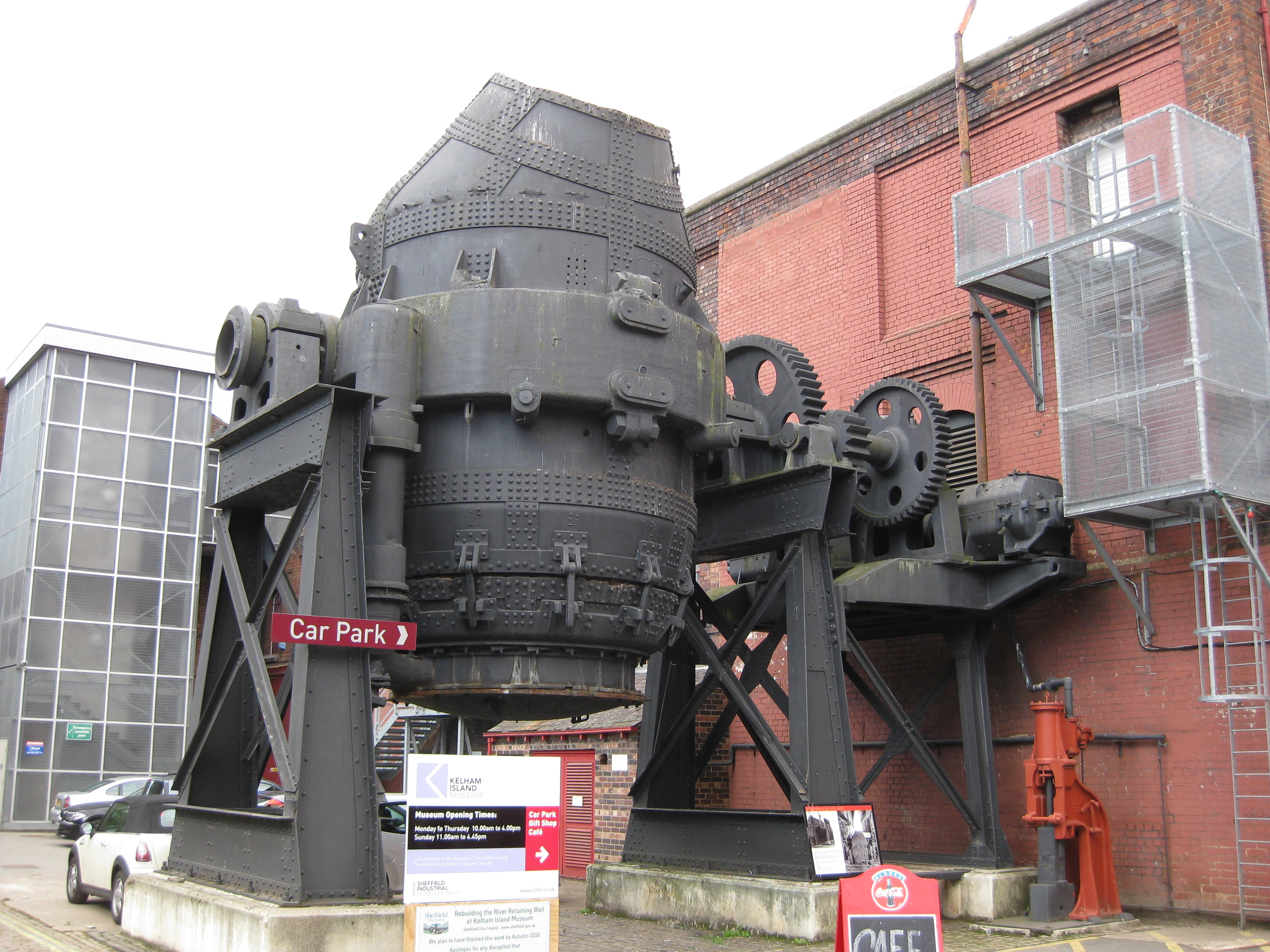
Bessemer converter, Kelham Island Museum, Sheffield, England (2010)

=== Patent ===
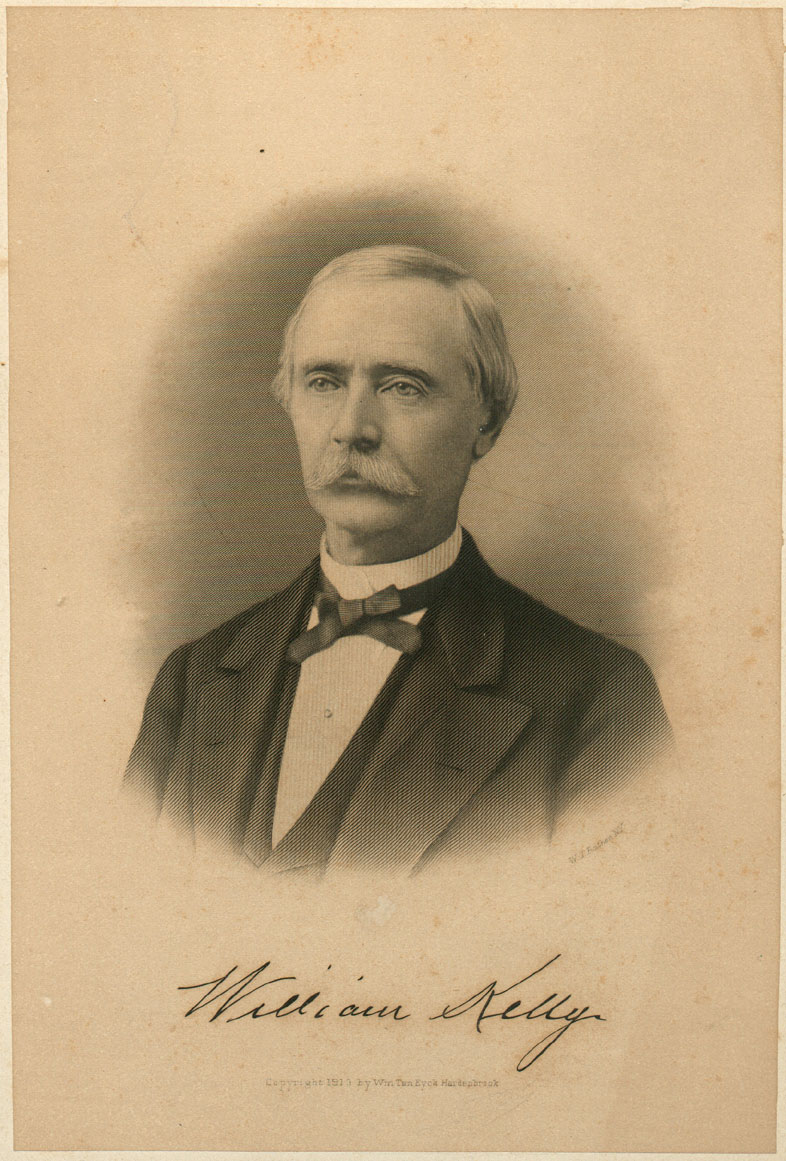
William Kelly is credited with experimenting with a similar process before Bessemer's patent.

In the early to mid-1850s, the American inventor William Kelly experimented with a method similar to the Bessemer process. Wagner writes that Kelly may have been inspired by techniques introduced by Chinese ironworkers hired by Kelly in 1854. The claim that both Kelly and Bessemer invented the same process remains controversial. When Bessemer's patent for the process was reported by Scientific American, Kelly responded by writing a letter to the magazine. In the letter, Kelly states that he had previously experimented with the process and claimed that Bessemer knew of Kelly's discovery. He wrote that "I have reason to believe my discovery was known in England three or four years ago, as a number of English puddlers visited this place to see my new process. Several of them have since returned to England and may have spoken of my invention there." It is suggested Kelly's process was less developed and less successful than Bessemer's process.

Principle of Bessemer process

Sir Henry Bessemer described the origin of his invention in his autobiography written in 1890. During the outbreak of the Crimean War, many English industrialists and inventors became interested in military technology. According to Bessemer, his invention was inspired by a conversation with Napoleon III in 1854 pertaining to the steel required for better artillery. Bessemer claimed that it "was the spark which kindled one of the greatest revolutions that the present century had to record, for during my solitary ride in a cab that night from Vincennes to Paris, I made up my mind to try what I could to improve the quality of iron in the manufacture of guns." At the time, steel was used to make only small items like cutlery and tools, but was too expensive for cannons. Starting in January 1855, he began working on a way to produce steel in the massive quantities required for artillery and by October he filed his first patent related to the Bessemer process. He patented the method a year later in 1856. William Kelly was awarded priority patent in 1857.

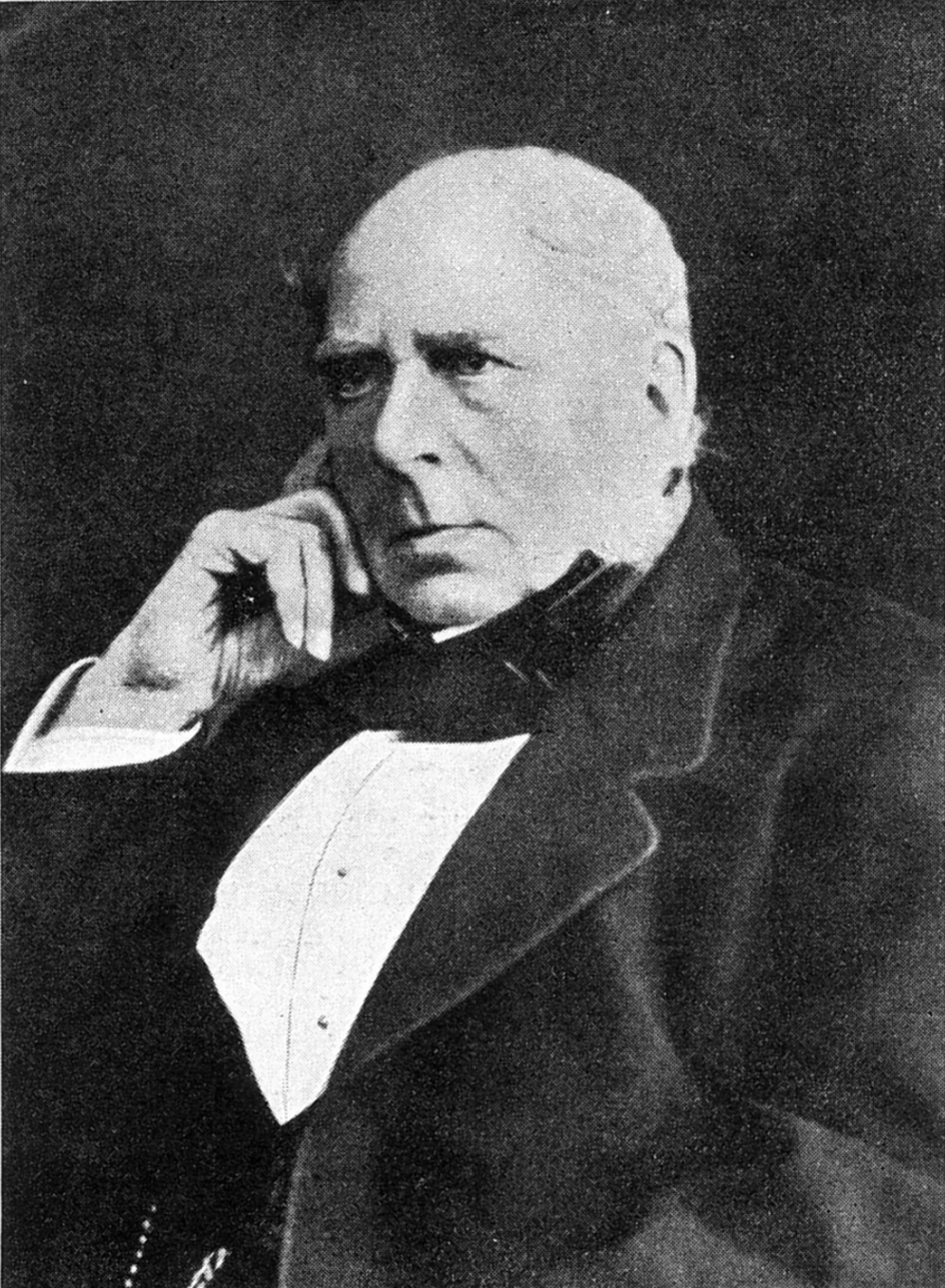
Henry Bessemer

Bessemer licensed the patent for his process to four ironmasters, for a total of £27,000, but the licensees failed to produce the quality of steel he had promised—it was "rotten hot and rotten cold", according to his friend, William Clay—and he later bought them back for £32,500. His plan had been to offer the licenses to one company in each of several geographic areas, at a royalty price per ton that included a lower rate on a proportion of their output in order to encourage production, but not so large a proportion that they might decide to reduce their selling prices. By this method he hoped to cause the new process to gain in standing and market share.

He realised that the technical problem was due to impurities in the iron and concluded that the solution lay in knowing when to turn off the flow of air in his process so that the impurities were burned off but just the right amount of carbon remained. However, despite spending tens of thousands of pounds on experiments, he could not find the answer. Certain grades of steel are sensitive to the 78% nitrogen, which was part of the air blast passing through the steel.

The solution was first discovered by English metallurgist Robert Forester Mushet, who had carried out thousands of experiments in the Forest of Dean. His method was to first burn off, as far as possible, all the impurities and carbon, then reintroduce carbon and manganese by adding an exact amount of spiegeleisen, an alloy of iron and manganese with trace amounts of carbon and silicon. This had the effect of improving the quality of the finished product, increasing its malleability—its ability to withstand rolling and forging—at high temperatures and making it more suitable for a vast array of uses. Mushet's patent ultimately lapsed due to Mushet's inability to pay the patent fees and was acquired by Bessemer. Bessemer earned over 5 million dollars in royalties from the patents.

The first company to license the process was the Manchester firm of W & J Galloway, and they did so before Bessemer announced it at Cheltenham in 1856. They are not included in his list of the four to whom he refunded the license fees. However, they subsequently rescinded their license in 1858 in return for the opportunity to invest in a partnership with Bessemer and others. This partnership began to manufacture steel in Sheffield from 1858, initially using imported charcoal pig iron from Sweden. This was the first commercial production.

A 20% share in the Bessemer patent was also purchased for use in Sweden and Norway by Swedish trader and consul Göran Fredrik Göransson during a visit to London in 1857. During the first half of 1858, Göransson, together with a small group of engineers, experimented with the Bessemer process at Edsken near Hofors, Sweden before he finally succeeded. Later in 1858 he again met with Henry Bessemer in London, managed to convince him of his success with the process, and negotiated the right to sell his steel in England. Production continued in Edsken, but it was far too small for the industrial-scale production needed. In 1862 Göransson built a new factory for his Högbo Iron and Steel Works company on the shore of Lake Storsjön, where the town of Sandviken was founded. The company was renamed Sandviken's Ironworks, continued to grow and eventually became Sandvik in the 1970s.

=== Industrial revolution ===
Alexander Lyman Holley contributed significantly to the success of Bessemer steel in the United States. His A Treatise on Ordnance and Armor is an important work on contemporary weapons manufacturing and steel-making practices. In 1862, he visited Bessemer's Sheffield works, and became interested in licensing the process for use in the US. Upon returning to the US, Holley met with two iron producers from Troy, New York, John F. Winslow and John Augustus Griswold, who asked him to return to the United Kingdom and negotiate with the Bank of England on their behalf. Holley secured a license for Griswold and Winslow to use Bessemer's patented processes and returned to the United States in late 1863.

The trio began setting up a mill in Troy, New York in 1865. The factory contained a number of Holley's innovations that greatly improved productivity over Bessemer's factory in Sheffield, and the owners gave a successful public exhibition in 1867. The Troy factory attracted the attention of the Pennsylvania Railroad, which wanted to use the new process to manufacture steel rail. It funded Holley's second mill as part of its Pennsylvania Steel subsidiary. Between 1866 and 1877, the partners were able to license a total of 11 Bessemer steel mills.

One of the investors they attracted was Andrew Carnegie, who saw great promise in the new steel technology after a visit to Bessemer in 1872, and saw it as a useful adjunct to his existing businesses, the Keystone Bridge Company and the Union Iron Works. Holley built the new steel mill for Carnegie, and continued to improve and refine the process. The new mill, known as the Edgar Thomson Steel Works, opened in 1875, and started the growth of the United States as a major world steel producer. Using the Bessemer process, Carnegie Steel was able to reduce the costs of steel railroad rails from $100 per ton to $50 per ton between 1873 and 1875. The price of steel continued to fall until Carnegie was selling rails for $18 per ton by the 1890s. Prior to the opening of Carnegie's Thomson Works, steel output in the United States totaled around 157,000 tons per year. By 1910, American companies were producing 26 million tons of steel annually.

William Walker Scranton, manager and owner of the Lackawanna Iron & Coal Company in Scranton, Pennsylvania, had also investigated the process in Europe. He built a mill in 1876 using the Bessemer process for steel rails and quadrupled his production.

Bessemer steel was used in the United States primarily for railroad rails. During the construction of the Brooklyn Bridge, a major dispute arose over whether crucible steel should be used instead of the cheaper Bessemer steel. In 1877, Abram Hewitt wrote a letter urging against the use of Bessemer steel. Bids had been submitted for both crucible steel and Bessemer steel; John A. Roebling's Sons submitted the lowest bid for Bessemer steel, but at Hewitt's direction, the contract was awarded to J. Lloyd Haigh Co.

== Technical details ==
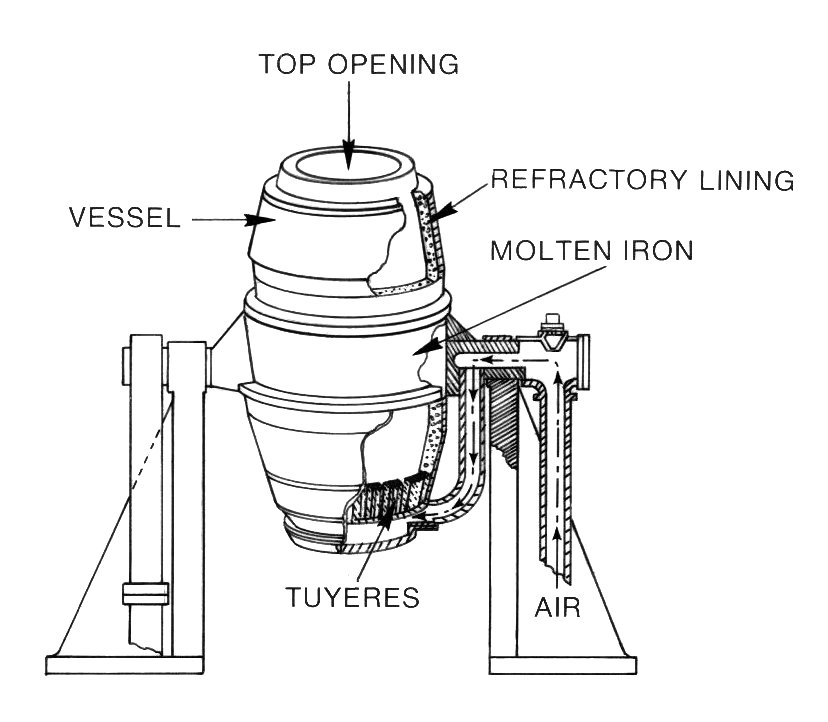
Bessemer converter components

Using the Bessemer process, it took between 10 and 20 minutes to convert three to five tons of iron into steel – it would previously take at least a full day of heating, stirring and reheating to achieve this.

=== Oxidation ===
Blowing air through the molten pig iron introduces oxygen into the melt. This oxidizes impurities such as silicon, manganese, and carbon. These oxides either escape as gas or form a solid slag. The refractory lining of the converter plays a role in the conversion — clay linings may be used when little phosphorus is present in the raw material. Bessemer himself used ganister sandstone–in the acid Bessemer process. Given high phosphorus content, dolomite or magnesite linings are used in the basic Bessemer limestone process. Materials such as spiegeleisen (a ferromanganese alloy), can then be added to the molten steel to establish specific properties.

=== Process ===
When the required steel forms, it is poured into ladles and then transferred into moulds while the (lighter) slag is left behind. The conversion process, called the "blow", initially took approximately 20 minutes. During this interval, the progress of the oxidation of the impurities is judged by the appearance of the flame in the mouth of the converter. The human eye was later replaced by photoelectric methods of monitoring the flame, increasing ultimate precision. After the blow, carbon is readded to the liquid metal and other alloying materials are added.

A Bessemer converter could treat a "heat" (batch of hot metal) of 5 to 30 tons at a time. They were usually operated in pairs: one was blown while the other was filled or tapped.

=== Basic variant ===
Industrial chemist Sidney Gilchrist Thomas tackled the problem of phosphorus in iron, which resulted in the production of low grade steel. Believing that he had discovered a solution, he contacted his cousin, Percy Gilchrist, who was a chemist at the Blaenavon Ironworks. The manager there, Edward Martin, offered Thomas test equipment and helped him draw up a patent issued in May 1878. Thomas's invention consisted of using dolomite or limestone linings for the Bessemer converter rather than clay, and it became known as the 'basic' Bessemer rather than the 'acidic' Bessemer process. An additional advantage was that the processes formed more slag in the converter, and this could be recovered and used profitably as fertilizer.

== Importance ==
Evolution of the production of wrought (puddled) iron, pig iron and steel in Great-Britain and France. The transition between each metal can be noticed on these graphics, for both countries.

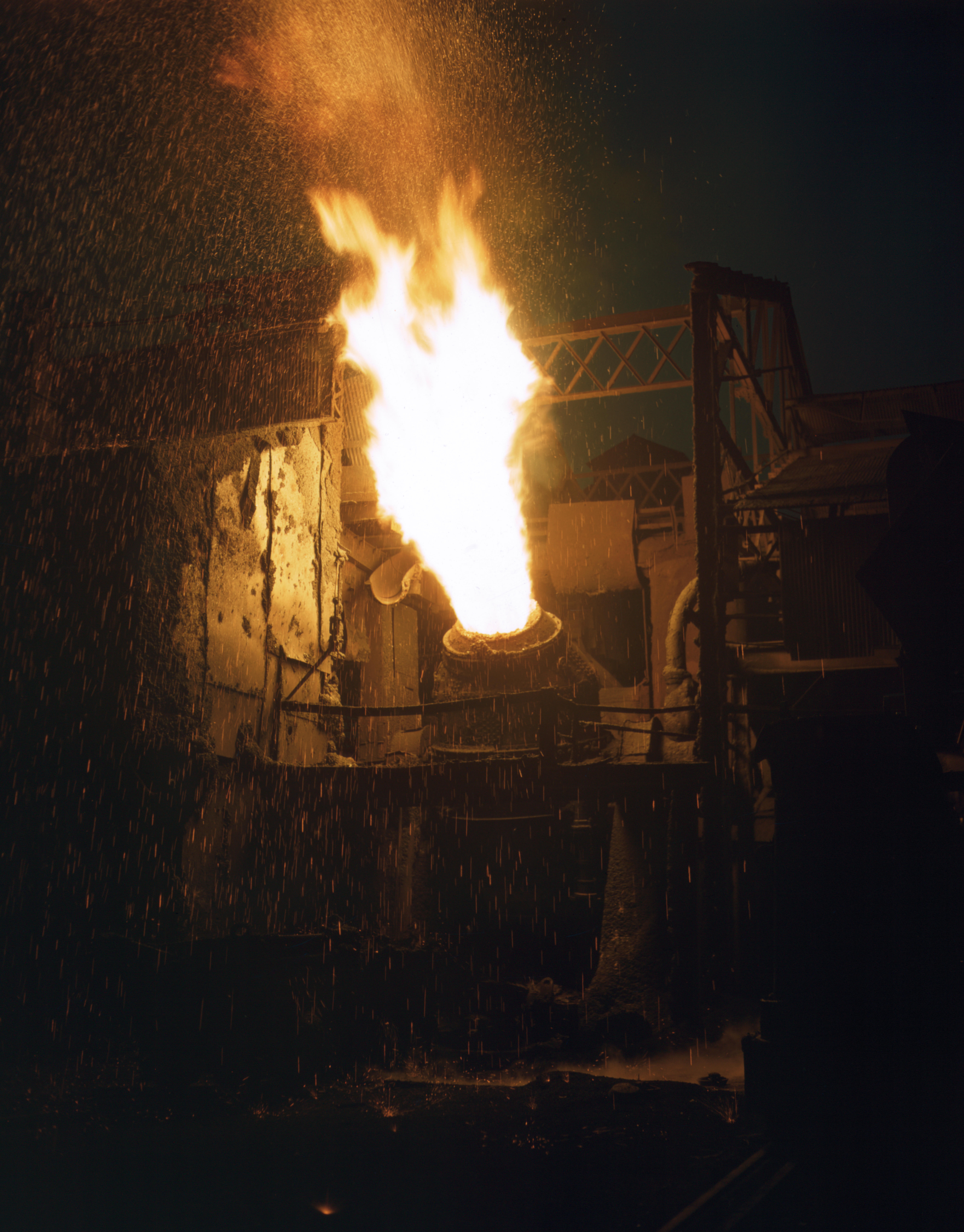
Bessemer furnace in operation in Youngstown, Ohio, 1941.

In 1898, Scientific American published an 1890 speech by politician and ironmaking industrialist Abram S. Hewitt called Bessemer Steel and its Effect on the World explaining the significant economic effects of the increased supply in cheap steel. They noted that the expansion of railroads into previously sparsely inhabited regions of the country had led to settlement in those regions, and had made profitable the trade of certain goods that had previously been too costly to transport.

The Bessemer process revolutionized steel manufacture by decreasing its cost, from £40 per long ton to £6–7 per long ton, along with greatly increasing the scale and speed of production of this vital raw material. The process also decreased the labor requirements for steel-making. Before it was introduced, steel was far too expensive to make bridges or the framework for buildings and thus wrought iron had been used throughout the Industrial Revolution. After the introduction of the Bessemer process, steel and wrought iron became similarly priced, and some users, primarily railroads, turned to steel. Quality problems, such as brittleness caused by nitrogen in the blowing air, prevented Bessemer steel from being used for many structural applications. Open-hearth steel was suitable for structural applications.

Steel greatly improved the productivity of railroads. Steel rails lasted ten times longer than iron rails. Steel rails could carry heavier locomotives, which could pull longer trains. Steel rail cars were longer and were able to increase the freight to car weight from 1:1 to 2:1.

== Obsolescence ==
As early as 1895 in the UK it was being noted that the heyday of the Bessemer process was over and that the open hearth method predominated. The Iron and Coal Trades Review said that it was "in a semi-moribund condition. Year after year, it has not only ceased to make progress, but it has absolutely declined." It has been suggested, both at that time and more recently, that the cause of this was the lack of trained personnel and investment in technology rather than anything intrinsic to the process itself. For example, one of the major causes of the decline of the giant ironmaking company Bolckow Vaughan of Middlesbrough was its failure to upgrade its technology. The basic process, the Thomas-Gilchrist process, remained in use longer, especially in Continental Europe, where iron ores were of high phosphorus content and the open-hearth process was not able to remove all phosphorus; almost all inexpensive construction steel in Germany was produced with this method in the 1950s and 1960s. It was eventually superseded by basic oxygen steelmaking.

In the U.S., commercial steel production using this method stopped in 1968. It was replaced by processes such as the basic oxygen (Linz–Donawitz) process, which offered better control of final chemistry. The Bessemer process was so fast (10–20 minutes for a heat) that it allowed little time for chemical analysis or adjustment of the alloying elements in the steel. Bessemer converters did not remove phosphorus efficiently from the molten steel; as low-phosphorus ores became more expensive, conversion costs increased. The process permitted only a limited amount of scrap steel to be charged, further increasing costs, especially when scrap was inexpensive. Electric arc furnace technology competed favourably with the Bessemer process, resulting in its obsolescence.

Basic oxygen steelmaking is essentially an improved version of the Bessemer process (decarburization by blowing oxygen as gas into the heat rather than burning the excess carbon away by adding oxygen-carrying substances into the heat). The advantages of pure oxygen blast over air blast were known to Henry Bessemer, but 19th-century technology was not advanced enough to allow for the production of the large quantities of pure oxygen necessary to make it economical.

== See also ==
- Cementation (metallurgy) process
- Methods of crucible steel production
