= Tourism in Chile =

Promotional videos on tourism in Chile and Easter Island of Sernatur.

Since the mid-1990s, tourism in Chile has become one of the main sources of income for the country, especially in its most extreme areas. In 2005, this sector grew by 13.6%, generating more than US$500 million, equivalent to 1.33% of the national GDP.

According to the World Tourism Organization (WTO), Chile was the eighth most popular destination for foreign tourists within the Americas in 2010, after the United States, Mexico, Canada, Argentina, Brazil, the Dominican Republic, and Puerto Rico. That year, 2,766,000 tourists entered the country, generating a revenue of US$1,636 million. The majority of these visitors came from American countries, mainly Argentina; however, the biggest growth in recent years has been in visitors from Europe, especially Germany.

In 2017, a record total of 6,449,993 international tourists visited Chile, a 13.3% increase from 2016. Argentina remained the most common country of origin, followed by Brazil. European tourists were third in terms of total numbers. The average tourist stayed for 10 nights. The Chilean government attributes the rise in tourism to "promotional campaigns, the development of new products and tourist destinations and a renewed diversification of experiences."

Tourism for the year 2018 was projected to continue the increase in visitors, with more than 7 million international tourists estimated to travel to Chile. Online guidebook Lonely Planet has listed Chile as its number 1 destination to visit in 2018. Lonely Planet emphasizes visiting the city of Valparaíso, the northern Atacama Desert, and Patagonia to the south. However, in 2018 and 2019, the Chilean tourism industry was plunged into a deep crisis by the adverse effects of internal unrest and the Argentine monetary crisis. As a consequence, Chile saw international tourism arrivals fall by more than 20% in 2019, to about 4.5 million. The following year, the COVID-19 pandemic caused further disruption to the Chilean tourism sector, with a fall of 85.7% on 2019 and total visitors estimated at 1,122,858. In 2021, just 161,000 foreigners visited Chile.

Yearly tourist arrivals in millions

== Geographic overview ==
Occupying the southwest part of South America, Chile is normally divided into three geographic areas:

- Continental Chile comprises a long and narrow strip of land on the west coast of the Southern Cone that extends between the parallels 17°29'57"S and Diego Ramírez Islands at 56°32'12"S, mostly from the southeastern shore of the Pacific Ocean to the Andes, across 4270 km
- Insular Chile corresponds to a set of islands volcanic origin in the South Pacific Ocean: the Juan Fernández archipelago and Desventuradas Islands, belonging to South America, the Salas y Gómez Island and Easter Island, geographically located in the Polynesia.
- The Chilean Antarctic Territory, is an area of Antarctica of 1,250,257.6 km^{2} between meridians 53°W and 90°W on which Chile claims sovereignty, extending its southern boundary to the South Pole. Because of its presence in the Americas, Oceania and Antarctica, Chile describes itself as a tricontinental country.

The latitudinal width of the country, which spans over 39° (over 72° if the Chilean Antarctic Territory is included) its elevation and influence of the Pacific Ocean are the main factors behind the climatic variety and landscape of Chile, which determines the development of the formation of different ecosystems in the country.

The main Chilean attractions are the 6,435 km long coast, the Andean Ski resorts, the mountains and volcanoes, and the islands and archipelagos, including Easter Island.

The country has 14 natural monuments, 36 National Parks, 10 biosphere reserves, 52 natural reserves, 39 sanctuaries of Nature, and 12 Ramsar wetlands, mainly in the extreme parts of the country.

Souvenirs one can buy in Chile include wines, copper etches, wood carvings, and textiles.

== Norte Grande ==
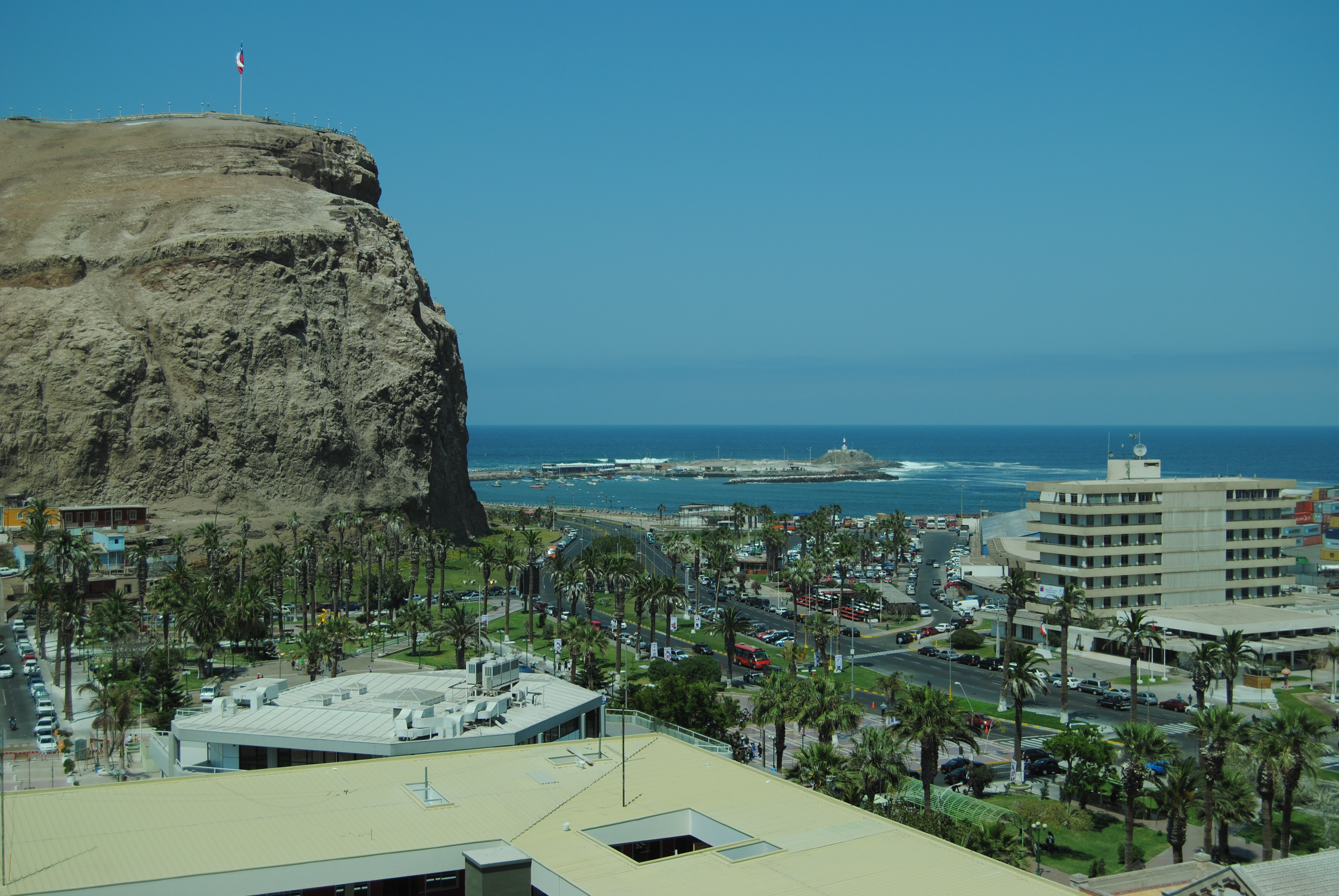
Arica

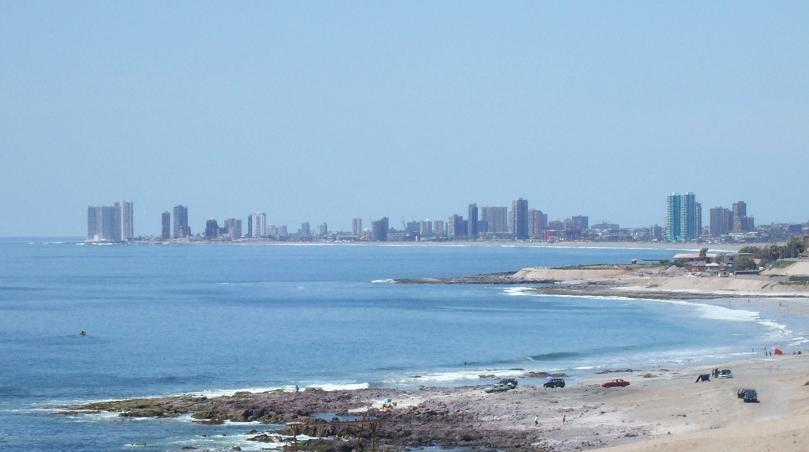
Iquique

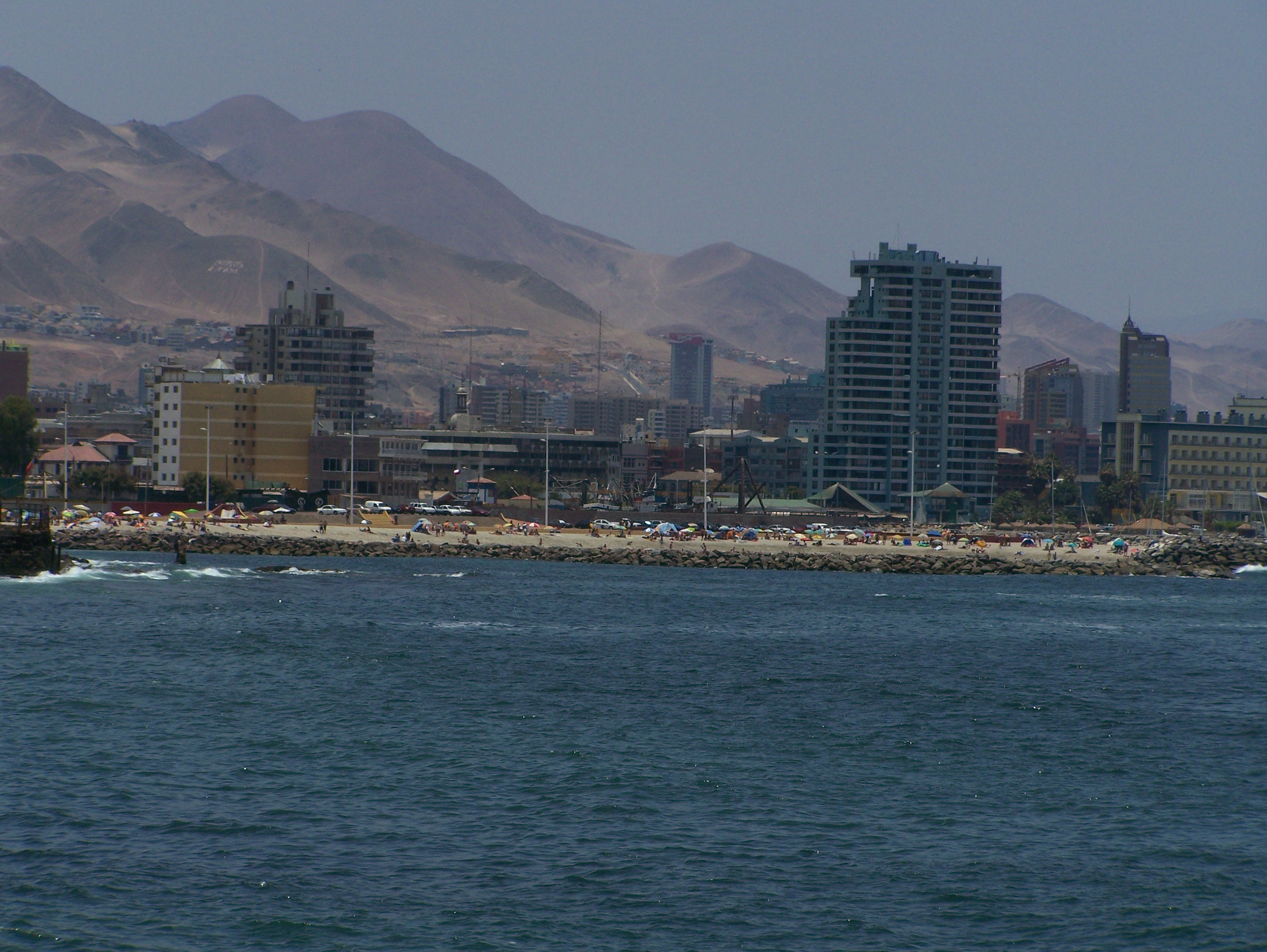
Antofagasta

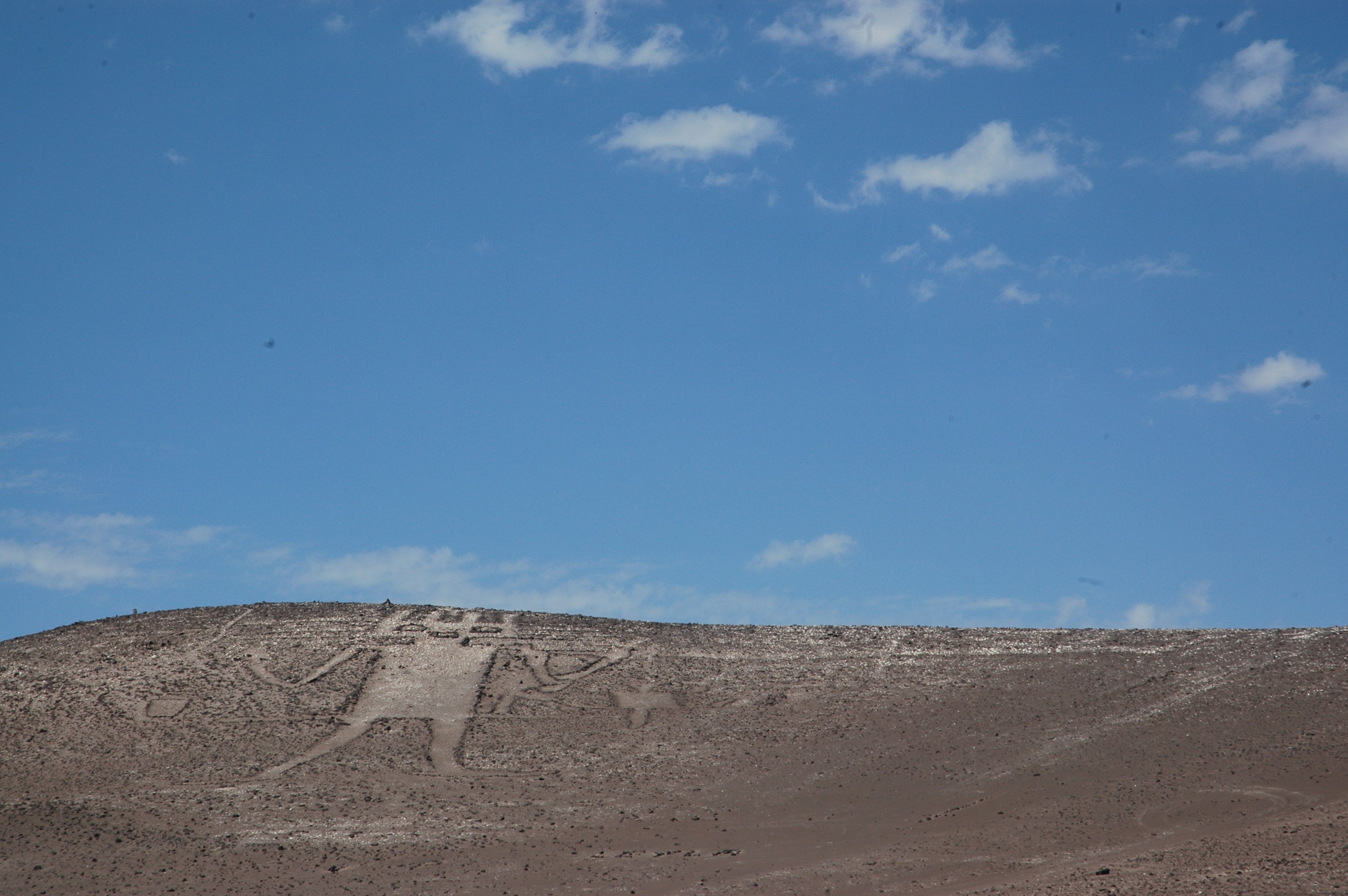
The Atacama Giant

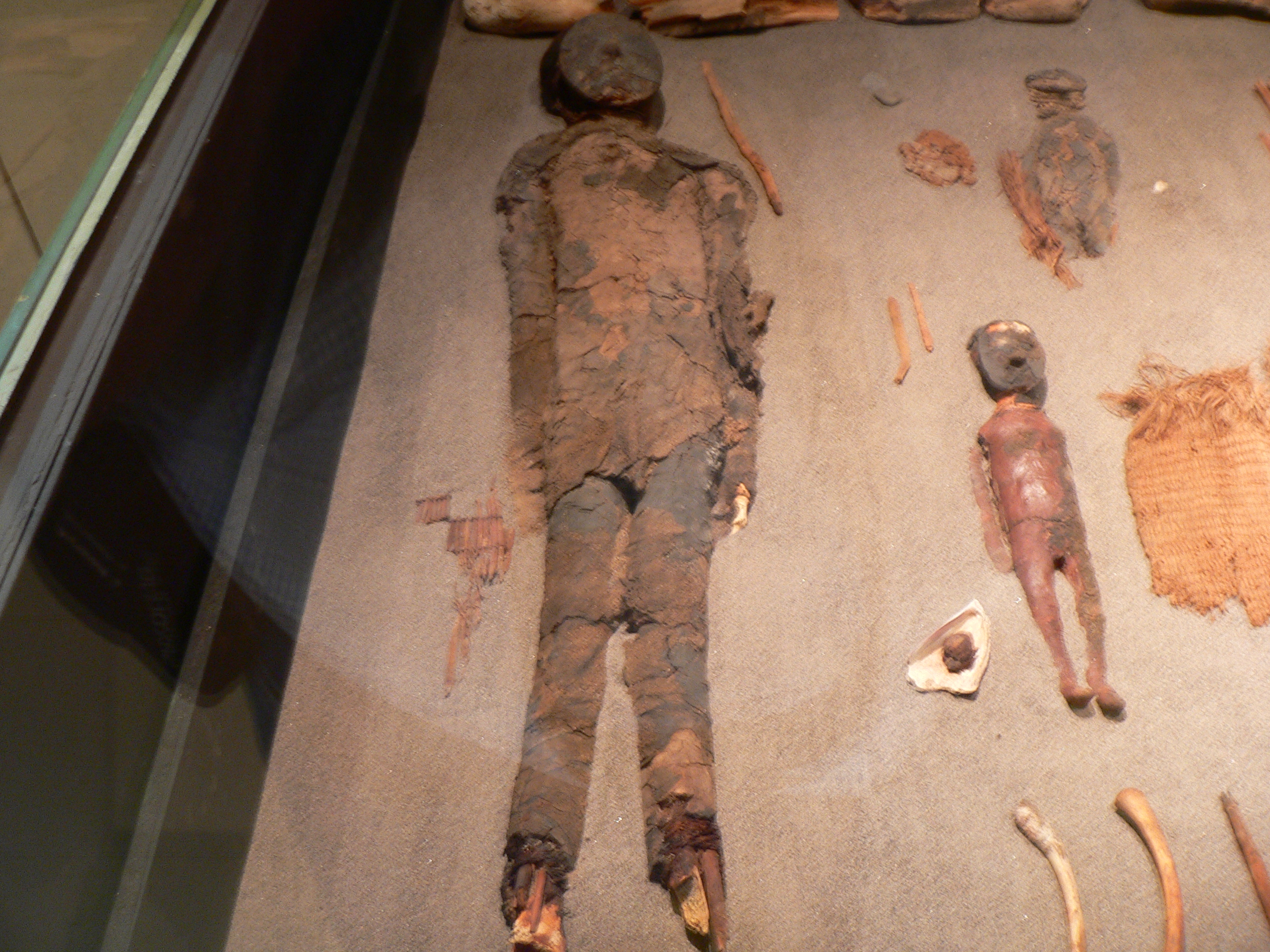
Chinchorro mummies

The Atacama Desert, the driest desert in the world was picked in October 2014 by Lonely Planet to be among the 10 top travel regions of 2015. The desert, which has been inhabited for several thousand years, makes up the main portion of the Norte Grande. A myriad of geoglyphs, petroglyphs and pictographs attest the presence of ancient cultures in the area. Among the most remarkable are those of Azapa Valley, Lluta Valley, the Atacama Giant and Pintados Geoglyphs, these latter are protected within the Pampa del Tamarugal National Reserve. R. P. Gustavo Le Paige Archaeological Museum and the Archaeological Museum of San Miguel de Azapa are home to the most important collections of artifacts and mummies in Chile, including the famous Chinchorro mummies, the oldest mummies in the world, of the Chinchorro culture buried between 5000 and 1700. C. The extreme aridity of the Atacama has been a key factor in the preservation of such archaeological remains.

The Chuquicamata copper deposit boasts the largest open pit mine in the world and the remains of extractions made from 12,000 and 10,000 years ago in an iron oxide mine, the oldest mine in the continent.

Arica is a coastal city with beaches and is also a starting point for travelers heading east to Putre for enjoying the majestic Puna landscape of Lauca National Park. Southward from Lauca, Volcán Isluga National Park includes ceremonial sites for the Aymara people.

Inland from Iquique, the desolate pampas are home to a few scattered towns and villages. Among those, the most interesting is the ghost town of Humberstone, declared World Heritage by UNESCO in 2005. In this area the tamarugo forests of the Pampa del Tamarugal break the barren monotony of the landscape.

The altiplano of Norte Grande has a wide variety of natural scenery including salt flats, volcanoes, lakes and geysers. San Pedro de Atacama and surrounding area offer one of the most spectacular combinations of archeology and awe-inspiring natural sights. San Pedro was the cradle of the Atacameño Culture. Villages with interesting cultural past are Caspana, Toconao, Socaire and Chiu Chiu. Notable are also the pre-Hispanic fortresses of Quitor, Lasana and Turi. Antofagasta is the largest city in Norte Grande. La Portada, a stunning natural arch, is located a short drive from Antofagasta.

Pan de Azúcar National Park is a park where sea and desert meet.

Also, there more than a dozen of astronomical facilities, including optical observatories and radio observatories. Among others, the most important are: Paranal (VLT), at an altitude of 2635 meters above sea level, is the world's most advanced and powerful astronomical observatory. the ALMA (Atacama Large Millimeter Array), to date the largest astronomical project in the world; and La Silla, all dependent of ESO (European Southern Observatory).

In this area can be seen the flowering desert, a phenomenon that occurs between September and November with normal range rainfall in the desert. In the end of the Norte Grande, near Putre, is the Lake Chungará, one of the highest lakes in the world at 4500 m above sea level, and Parinacota volcano. San Pedro de Atacama is frequently visited by foreign tourists who go to appreciate the architecture of the town, the highland lakes, and the Moon Valley, so named because its landscape resembles the moon.

The coastal resorts of the Norte Grande, like Arica, Iquique, Antofagasta, see an increase in national tourism during the summer months.

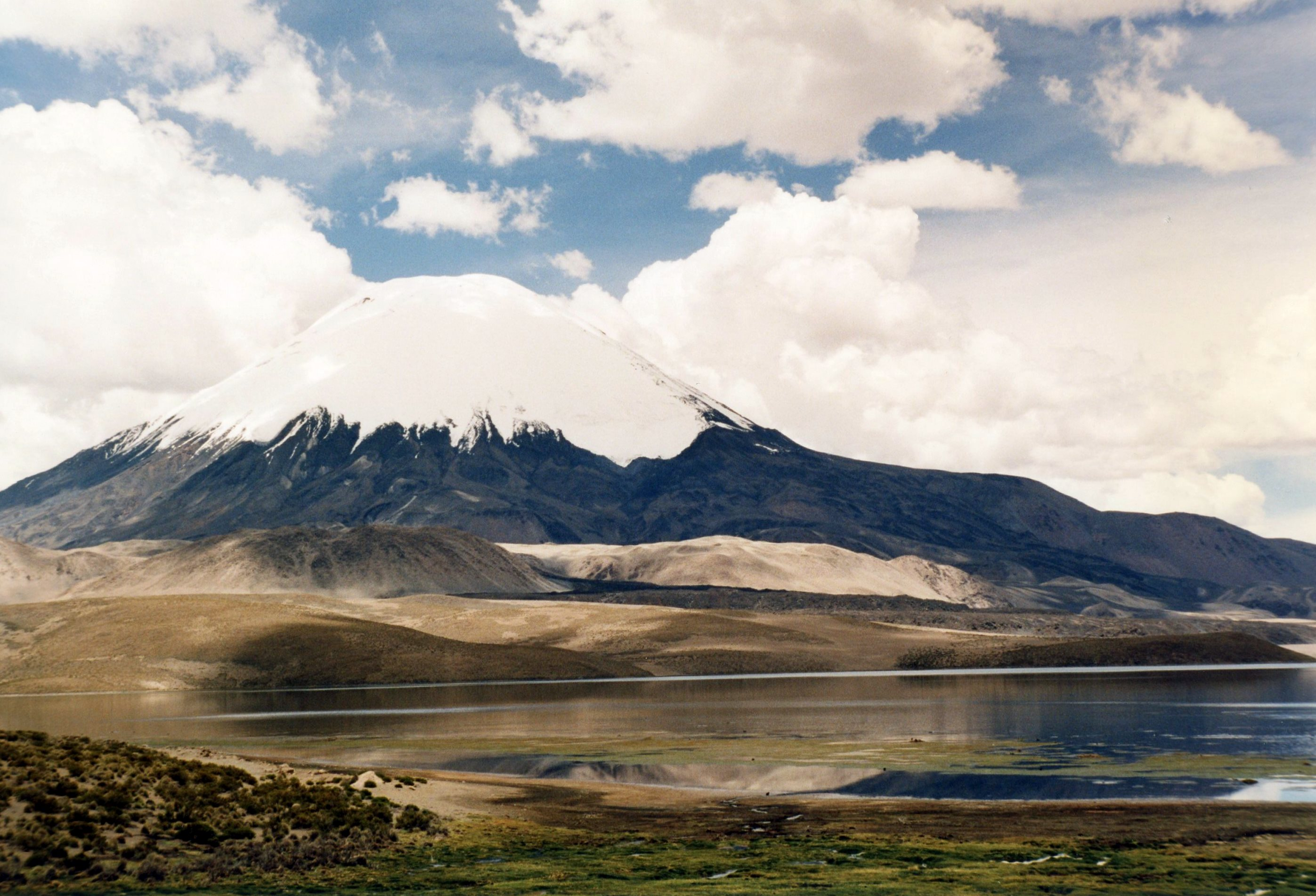
Lake Chungará and Parinacota volcano

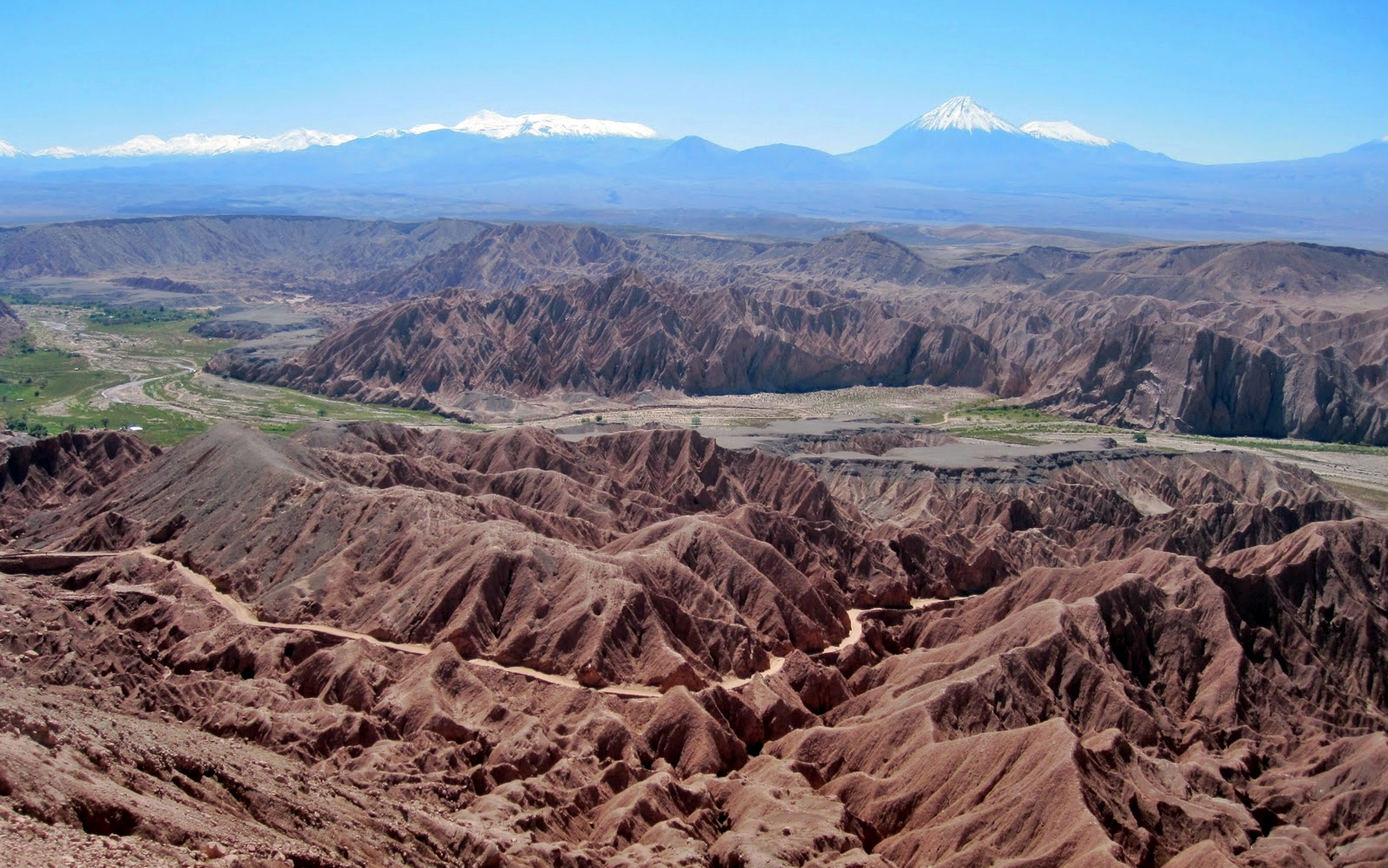
Valle de Atacama

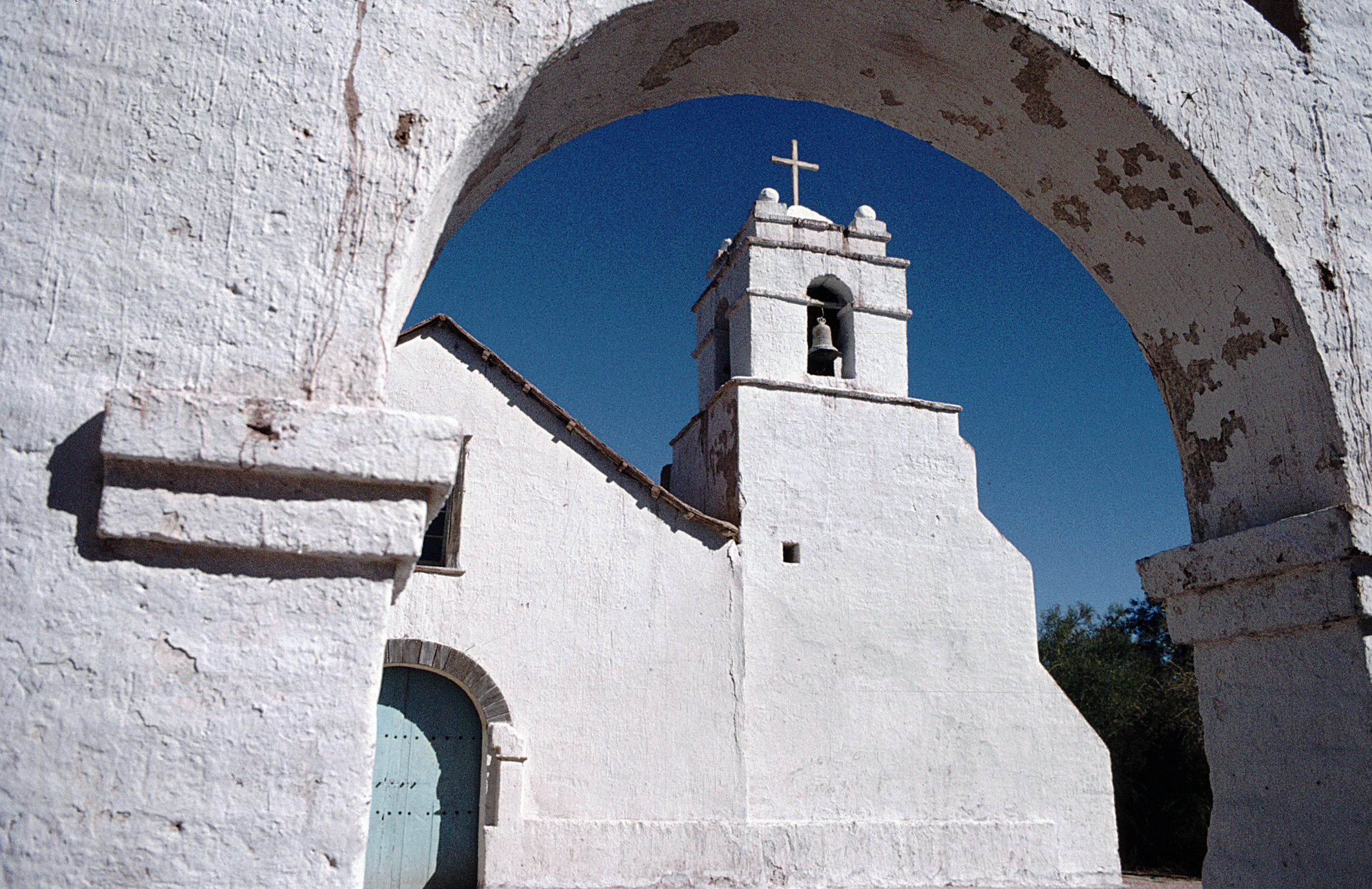
San Pedro de Atacama

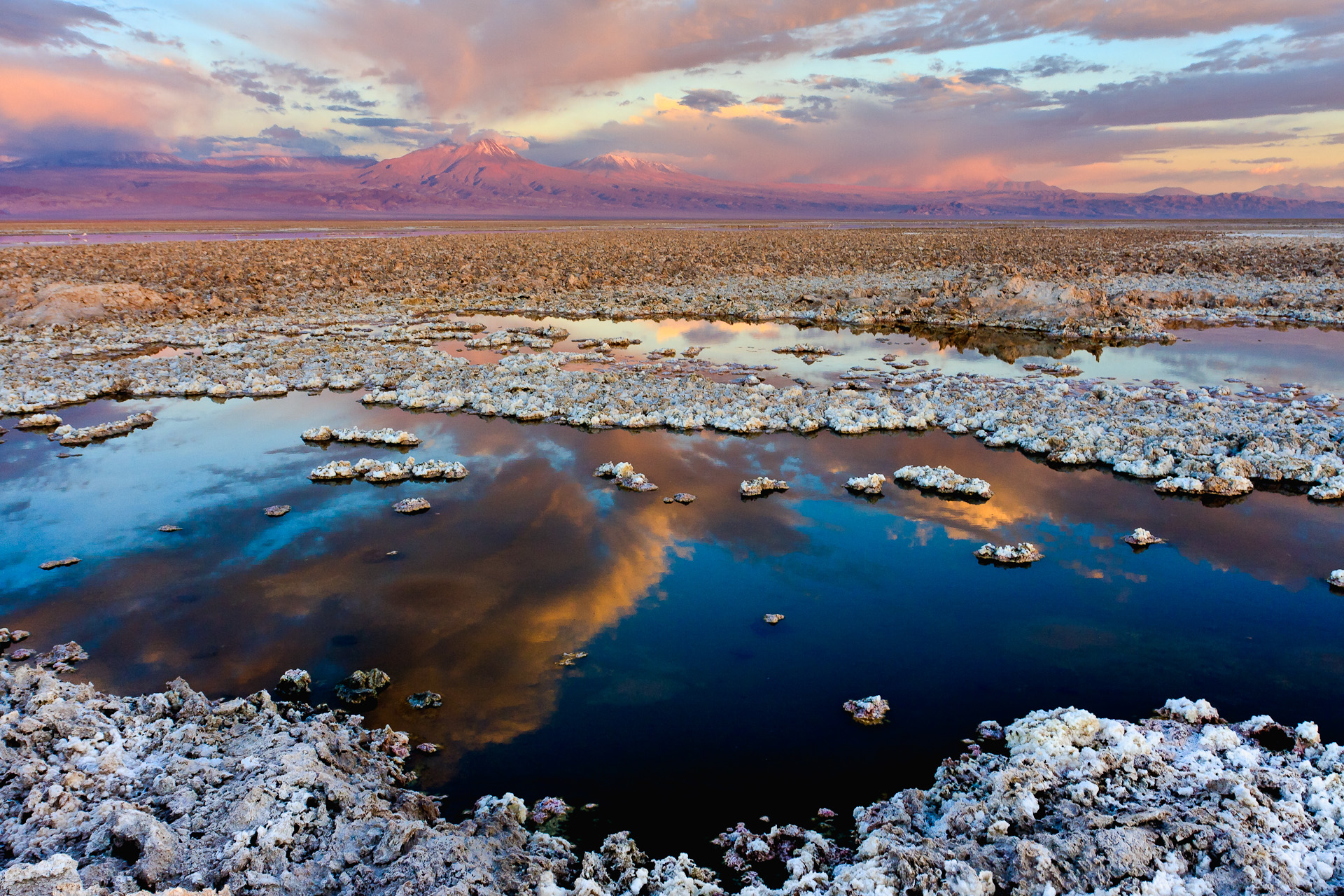
Salar de Atacama in the Atacama Desert

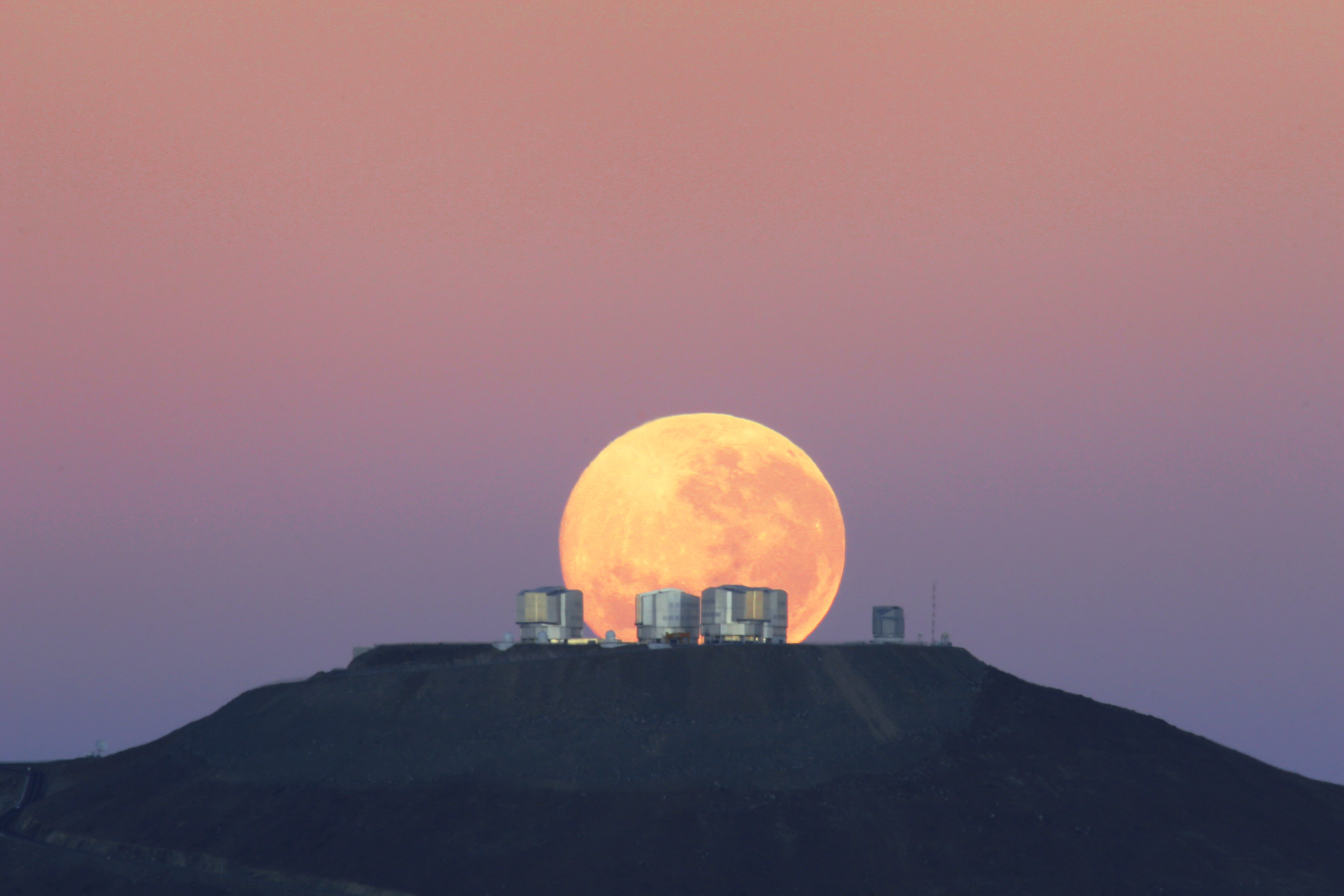
Very Large Telescope (VLT), Paranal Observatory

== Norte Chico ==
The Andes of Norte Chico are home to many of the highest volcanoes in the world, the highlight being the Ojos del Salado, the highest active volcano in the world at 6,891.3 meters tall and the highest peak in Chile. It is also the second highest peak in the Southern and Western hemispheres. Apart from Ojos del Salado and other volcanoes, attractions in this portion of the Andes include Nevado Tres Cruces National Park and Laguna Verde.

Norte Chico boasts some of the best beaches and exclusive coastal resorts in the country, such as Bahía Inglesa and those of La Serena, and Coquimbo. These also see an increase in national tourism during the summer months.

The clear skies of Norte Chico and its world-renowned infrastructure have made it ideal for astronomical tourism.

Elqui Valley is a very popular destination. In January 2015, the travel section of The New York Times said the Elqui Valley as the 5th of the 52 places it had to visit in 2015. Here, the dazzling green of the valley floor contrasts nicely with the barren brown slopes of the mountains that flank it.

Also found within Norte Chico is El Tatio Geyser Field, the largest geyser fields in the Southern Hemisphere and the third largest in the world.

The syncretism between Aymara tradition and Catholicism has produced festivals and religious traditions, such as those dedicated to Our Lady of Mount Carmel in La Tirana and to Virgin of Andacollo, and carnivals. The Baile chino, one of the manifestations of religious fervor, was declared Intangible Cultural Heritage by UNESCO in 2014.

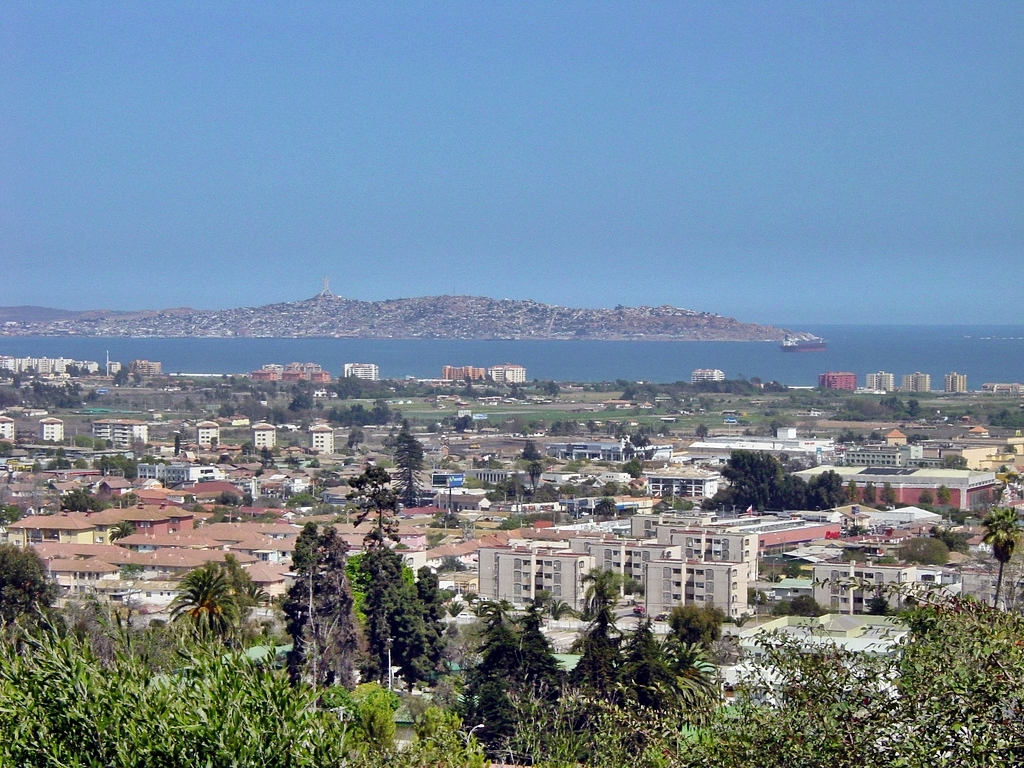
La Serena

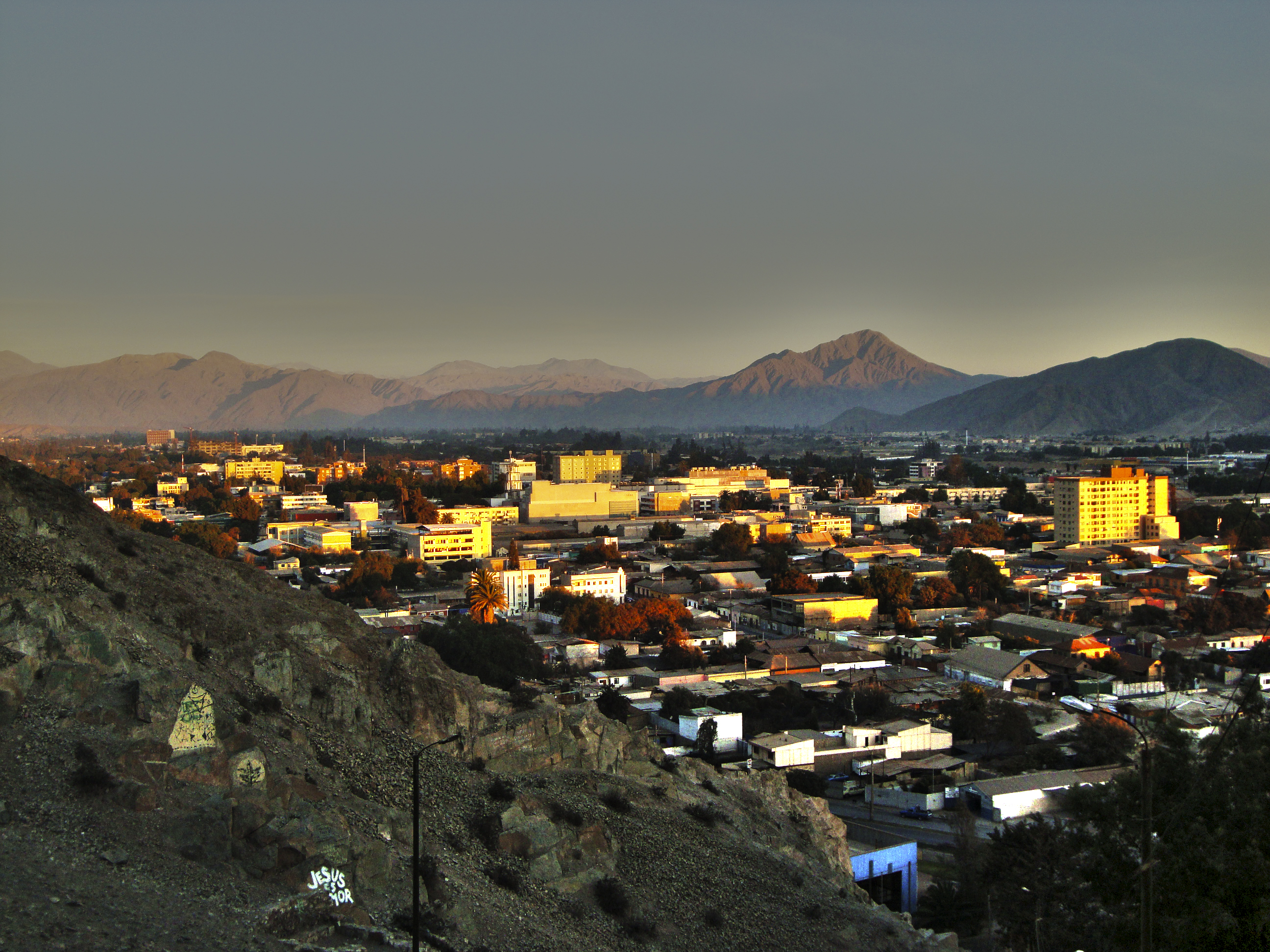
Copiapó

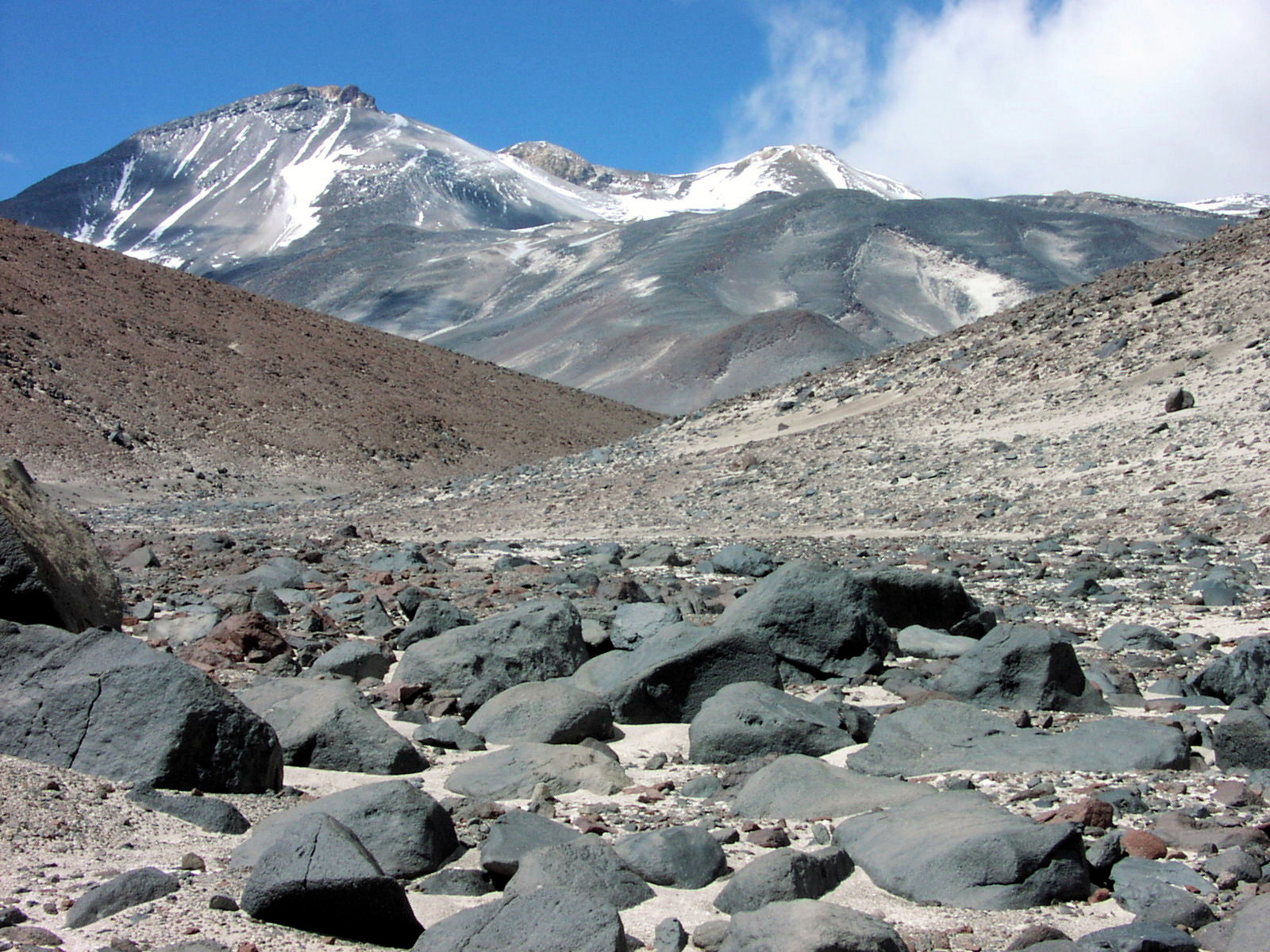
Ojos del Salado volcano

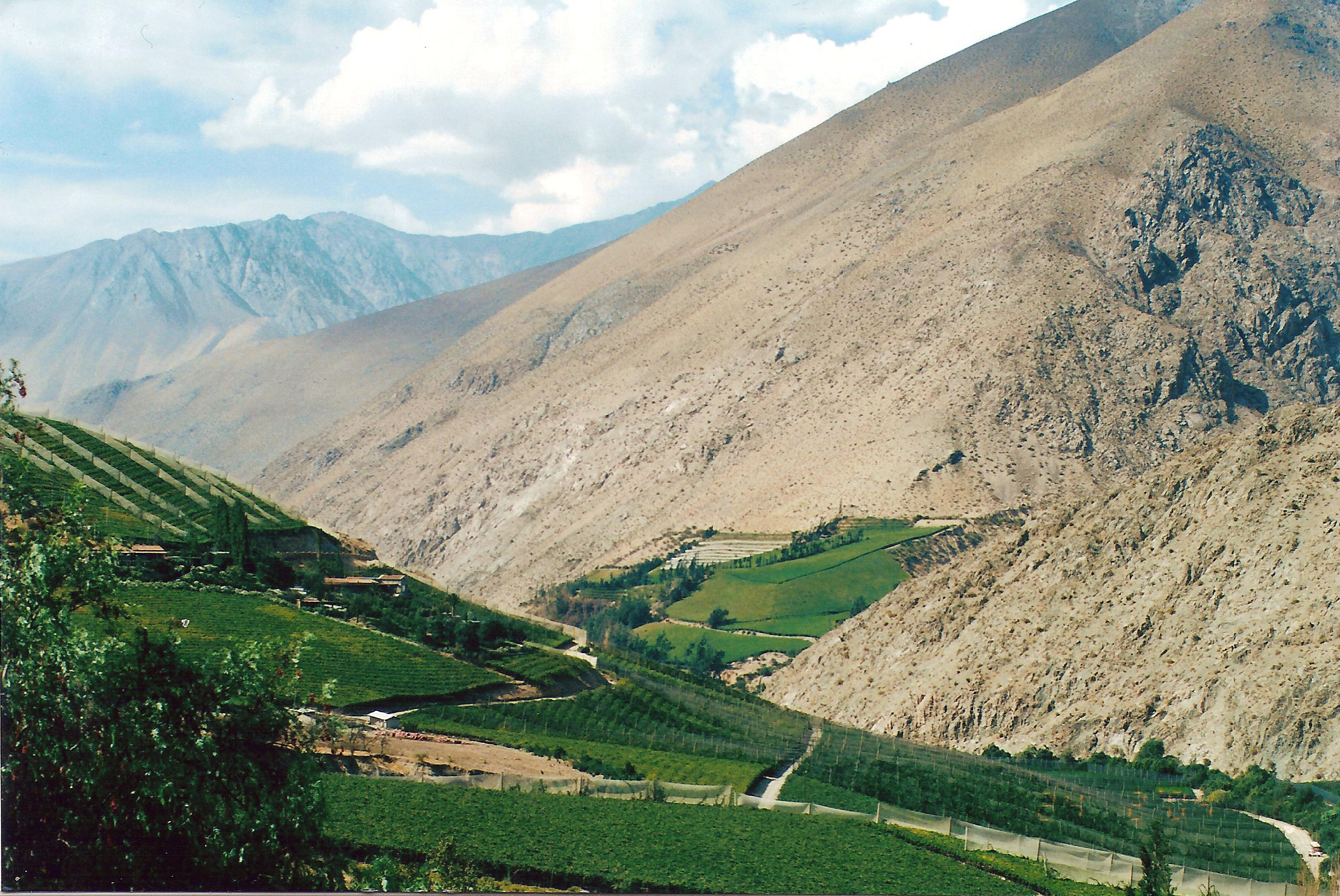
Elqui Valley, wine and pisco region

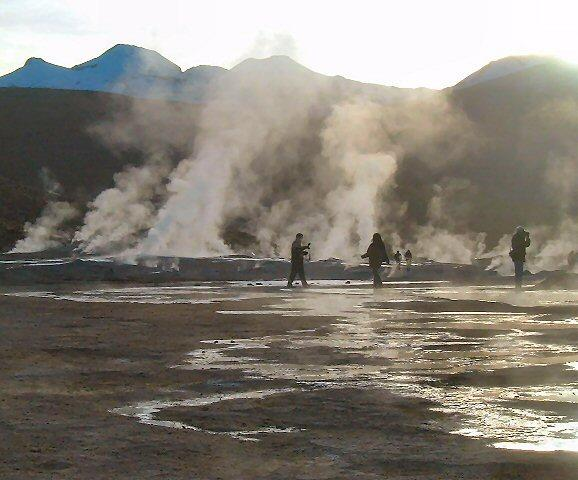
El Tatio geyser fields

== Zona Central ==
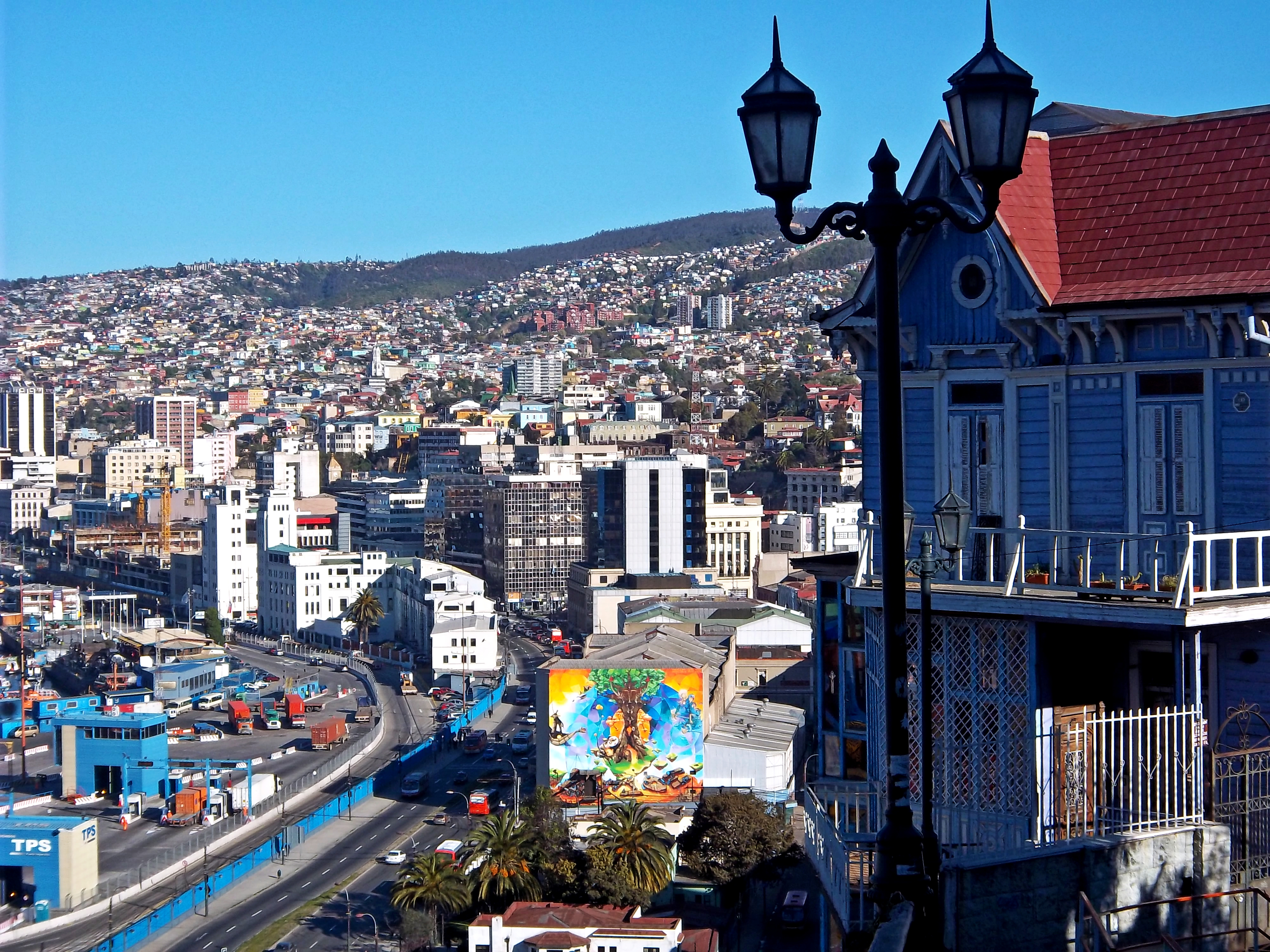
Valparaíso

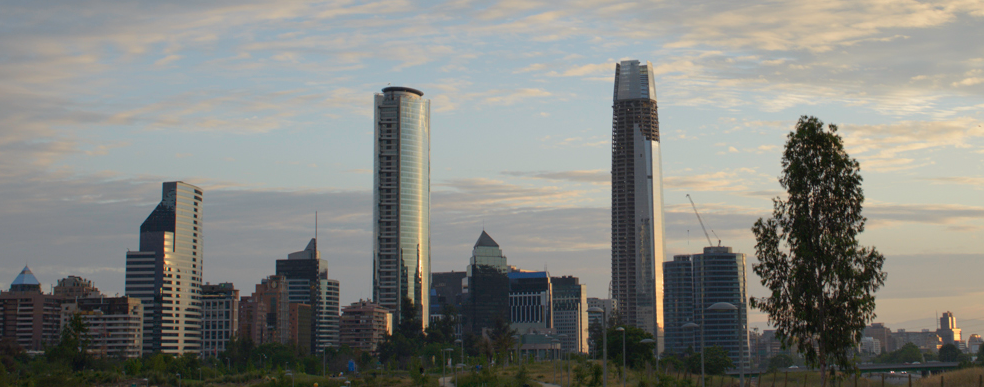
Santiago

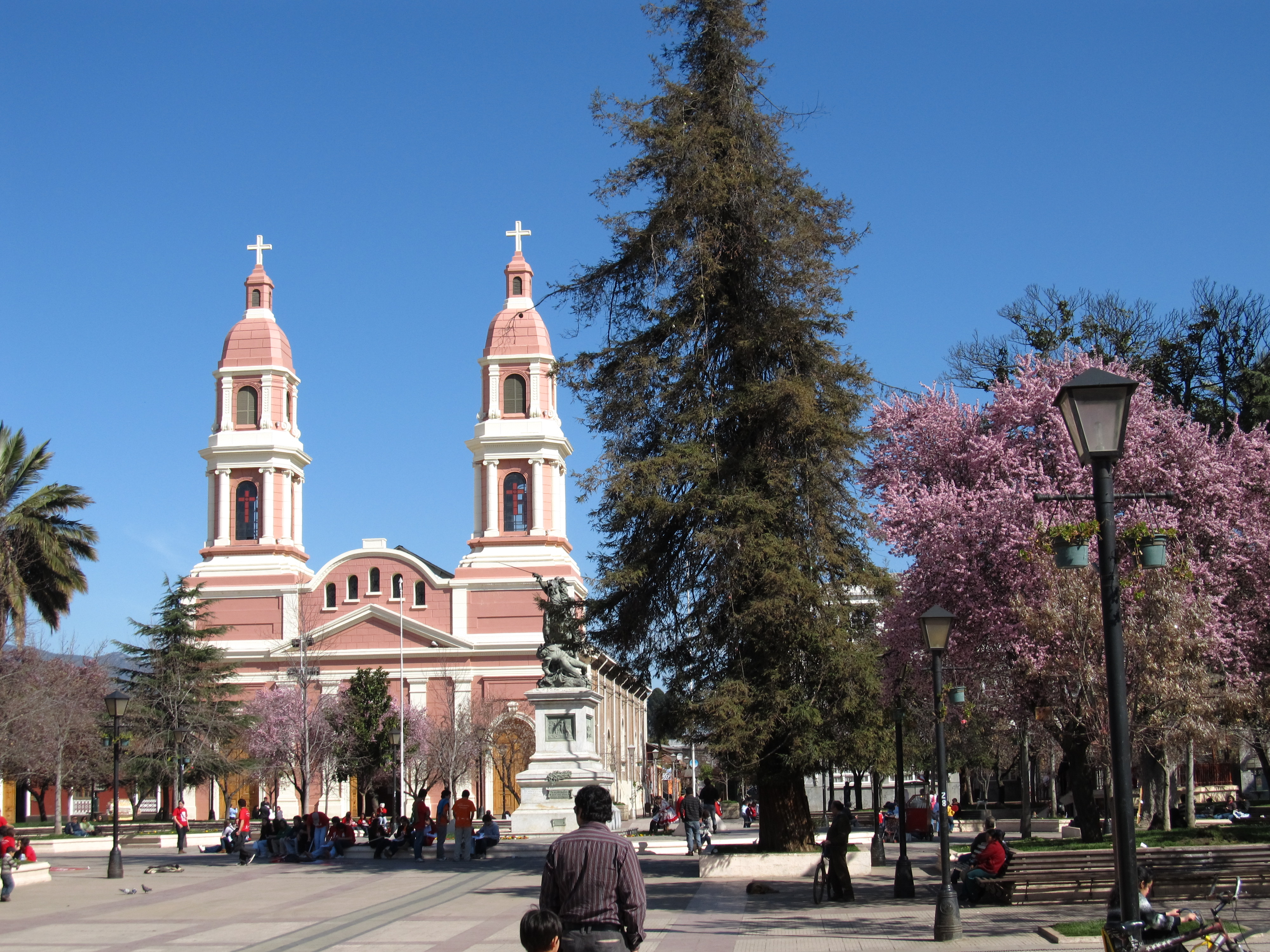
Rancagua

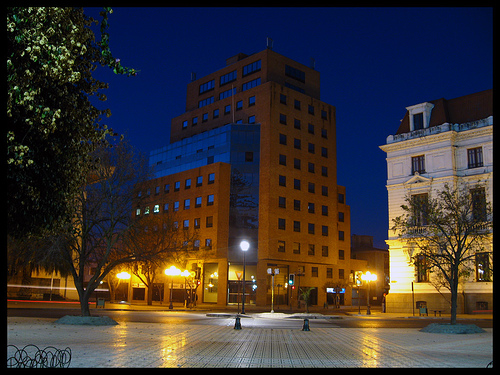
Talca

This area is home to the main ski resorts in Chile, which attract a significant number of tourists from the northern hemisphere because the reversed alpine skiing season. They are Chapa Verde, Portillo, Valle Nevado and Termas de Chillán. Furthermore, Wine tourism is common in Zona Central, and the Wine Routes of the Casablanca, Cachapoal and Colchagua Valley valleys are some of the finest in Chile.

Apart from the national capital itself and its many attractions, the metropolitan region surrounding Santiago includes several attractions such as the Cajón del Maipo, Pomaire, and some of the oldest vineyards in the country, as well as various archaeological sites.

Due to its proximity to the capital, the coast of the Valparaíso Region has the largest number of tourists during the summer months, primarily on the central coast and in Viña del Mar. The latter city is considered the tourist capital of Chile thanks to its thirteen beaches, its various entertainment centers, one of major casinos in the country, and the International Song Festival of Viña del Mar, the largest and best-known festival of Latin America.

Valparaíso is a wonderful, amphitheater-shaped city, whose historic quarter has been recognized as a World Heritage Site.

Santiago, the capital and main urban center of Chile, home to many historic sites and heritage. Within the Greater Santiago, there are 174 heritage sites under the custody of National Monuments Council (CMN), among which are archaeological, architectural and historical monuments, in addition to typical or picturesque areas. Of these, 93 are located within the commune of Santiago, considered the historic center of the city Although no Santiagan monument was even declared World Heritage by UNESCO, three have already been proposed by the Chilean government: the Incan sanctuary cerro El Plomo, the church and convent of San Francisco and Palace of La Moneda Meanwhile, in June 2012, the magazine National Geographic listed the Central Market of Santiago as fifth out of the ten best in the world. In January 2011, the travel section of The New York Times listed the city of Santiago as the first of the 41 places it had to visit that year, while TripAdvisor considered it the sixth best destination of South America in 2012.

The O'Higgins Region, south of Santiago, is known as "Huaso country" for its rural criollo culture. Pichilemu, in the O'Higgins Region, is reputed to have the best beaches for Surfing in Chile, if not the world. Other tourist sites in the O'Higgins region include the historically significant city of Rancagua, and the Rio de los Cipreses nature reserve.

Furthermore, in this area of the country are El Teniente, the most underground mine of copper in the world, and the mining town of Sewell, declared a World Heritage Site by UNESCO in 2006.

Further south in the Maule and Bio Bio regions are the Radal Siete Tazas National Reserve and Laguna del Laja National Park.

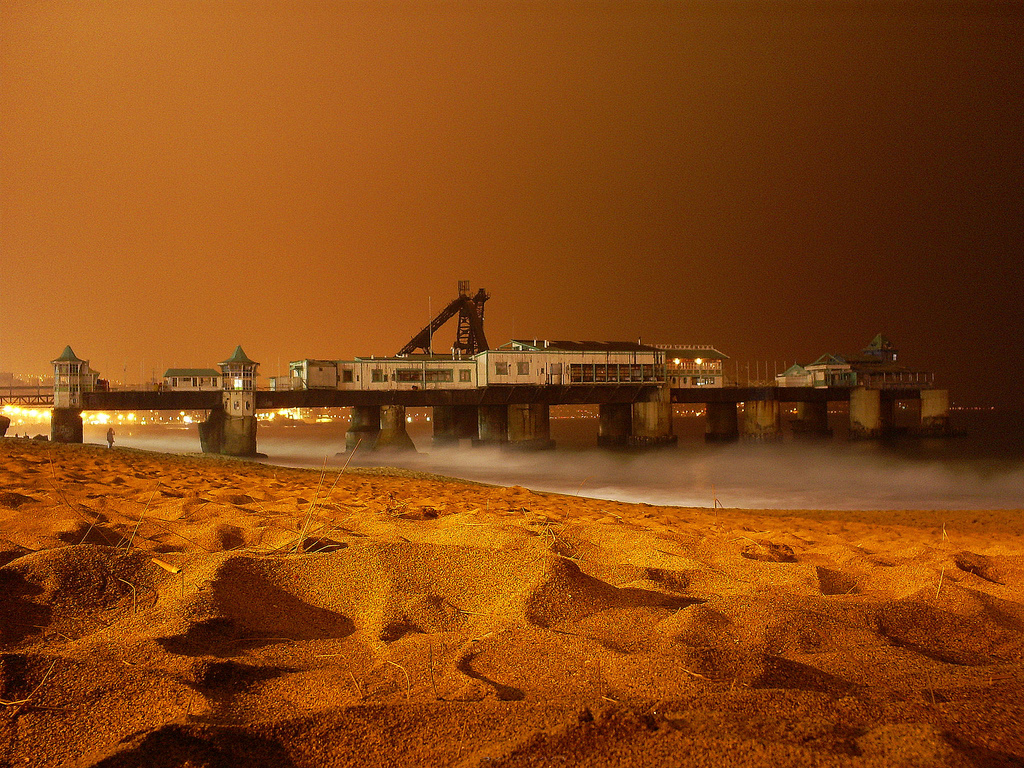
Viña del Mar

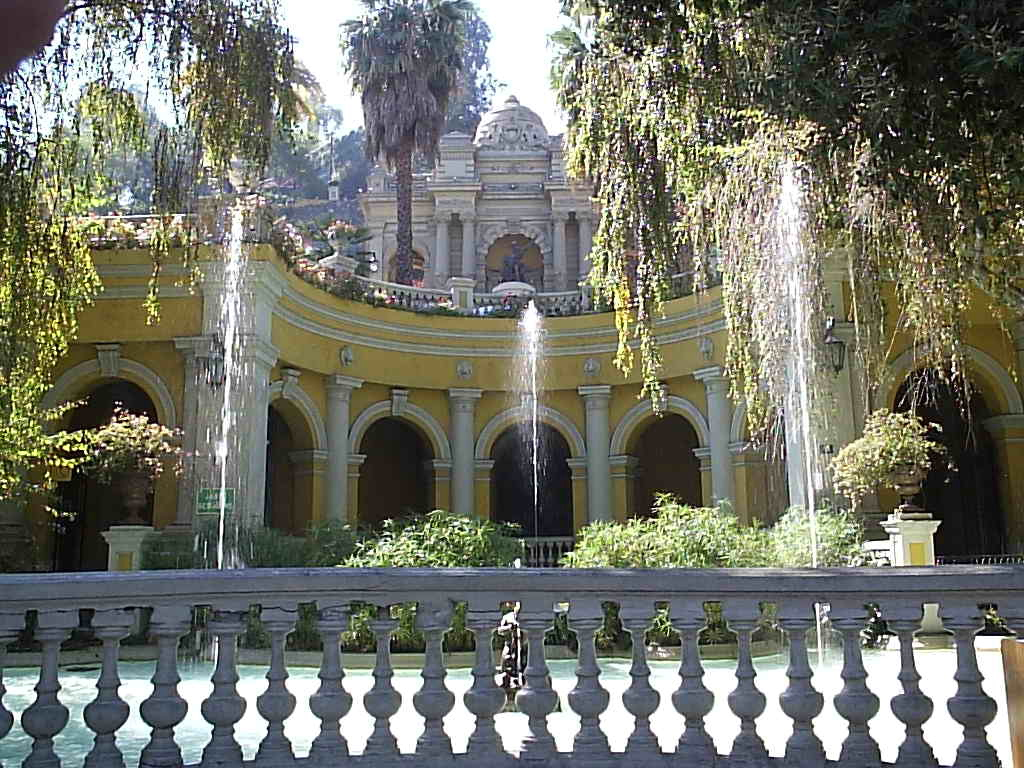
Cerro Santa Lucía

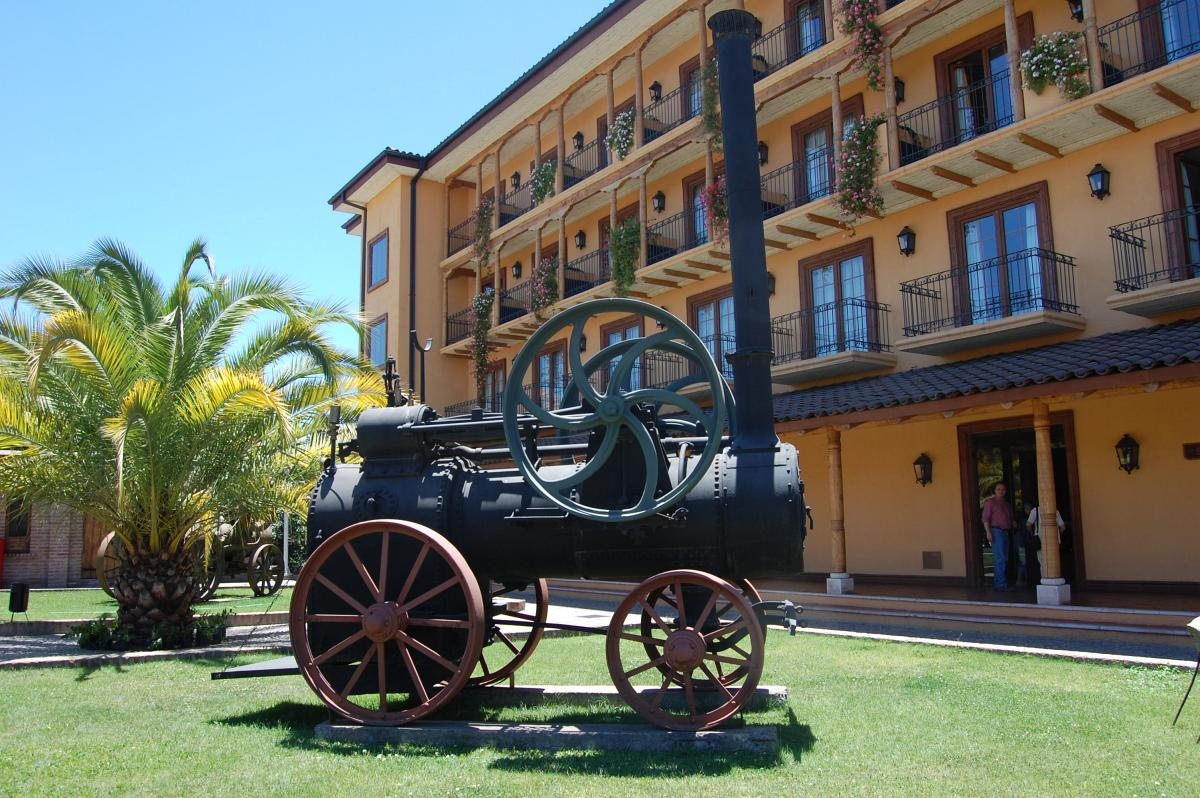
Colchagua Museum

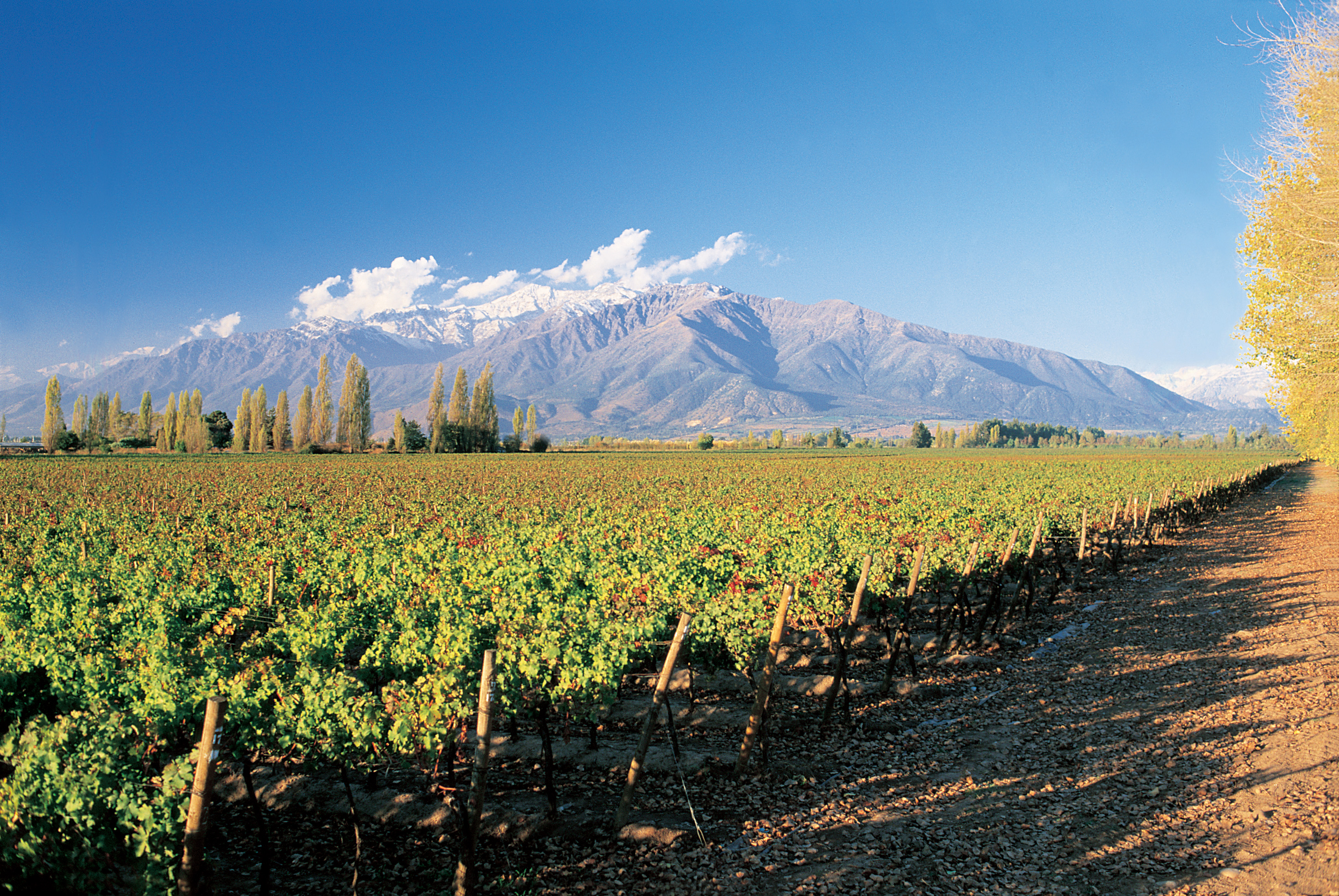
Vineyard near the Andes

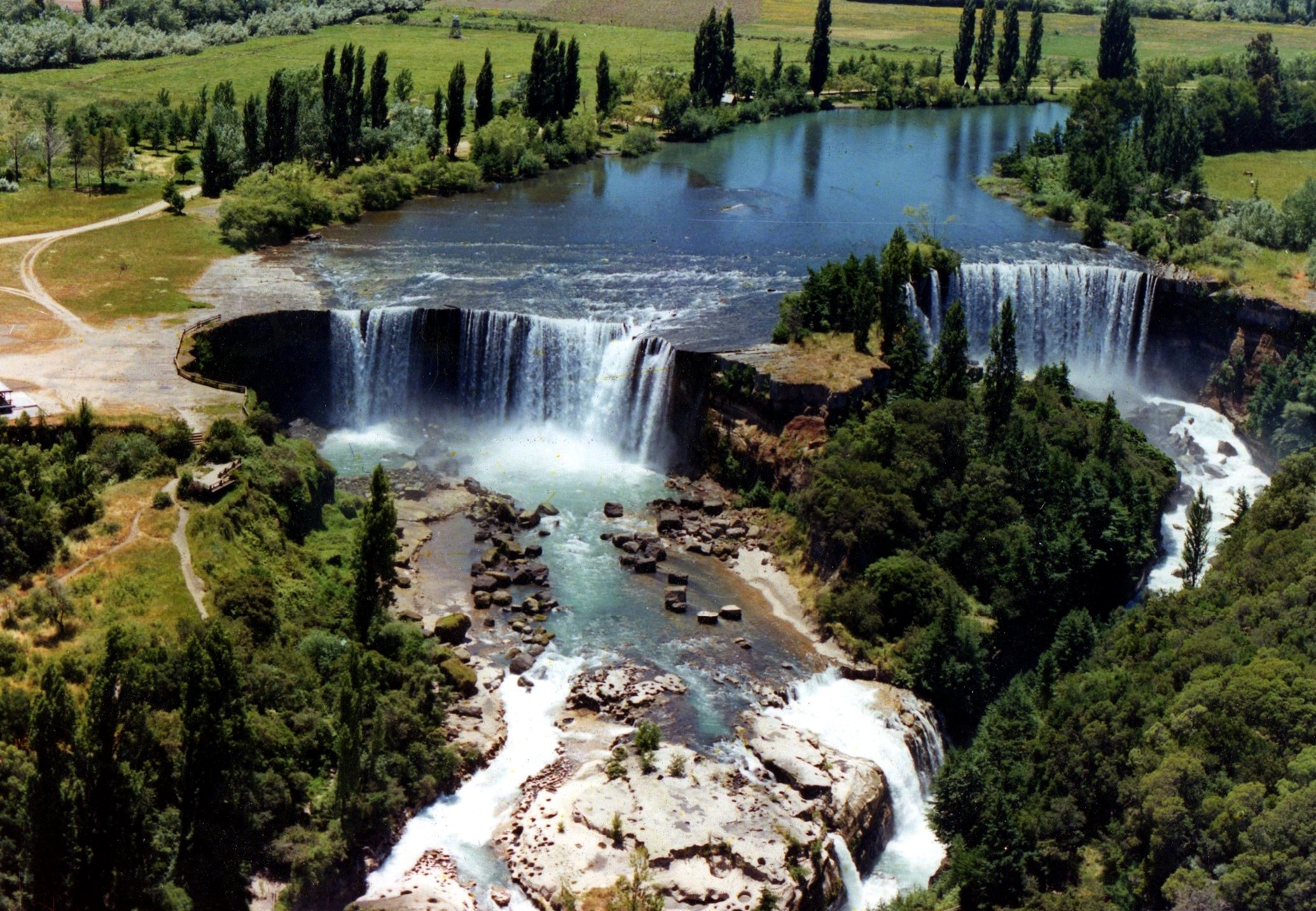
Laja Falls

== Zona Sur ==
Araucanía Region is the heartland of the Mapuche people. This area exhibits an incipient development of Indigenous tourism, in different sectors. in the coastal area of Araucania Ethnological tourism is developed on the banks Mapuche Budi Lake.

The Chilean Patagonia, the circuit of the Seven Lakes and various national parks like Conguillío, Vicente Pérez Rosales, the oldest in Chile and most visited of the country in 2011; Puyehue National Park between others.

The Andean sector of Araucania, highlight the great national parks, such as Conguillio National Park the forest of araucarias, Villarrica National Park, huerquehue National Park, Tolhuaca National Park besides the national reserves as Alto Biobio National Reserve, Malalcahuello National Reserve, Nalcas National Reserve, Malleco National Reserve, China Muerta National Reserve.

The capital of Araucania is Temuco, city of different service, hotels, tourist circuits, airport, markets, and the symbolic and historic sectors, the Cerro Ñielol Natural Monument is an icon of this city, and the most important tourist point.

Valdivia is one of Chile's most beautiful cities, recognition received mainly because of its lush natural surrounding. South from the city lies the colonial Valdivian Fort System.

Also in this area of the country are the Lake O'Higgins, the deepest lake of the Americas and fifth in the world with 836 meters; On the other hand, several studies have located the oldest archaeological remains of the current Chilean continental territory in Monte Verde, Los Lagos Region, about 14,800 B.C., at the end of Upper Paleolithic, making it the first known human settlement in the Americas.

The Lake District is characterized by piedmont lakes crowned by snowcapped volcanoes, whose lower flanks are covered with lush forests of native trees. Lovely lake-resort towns and villages dot the lakesides, chiefly Pucón, Villarrica, Frutillar and Puerto Varas. Puerto Montt is the tourist hub of the region; two of them, were considered among the best destinations in South America in 2012 by the specialized tourism site TripAdvisor.

The almost perfect cone of Osorno Volcano is an iconic landmark in the region, as is Villarrica Volcano, which is one of the few volcanoes in the world that has an active Lava lake.

As an added bonus, this zone includes the granite domes of the Cochamó Valley.

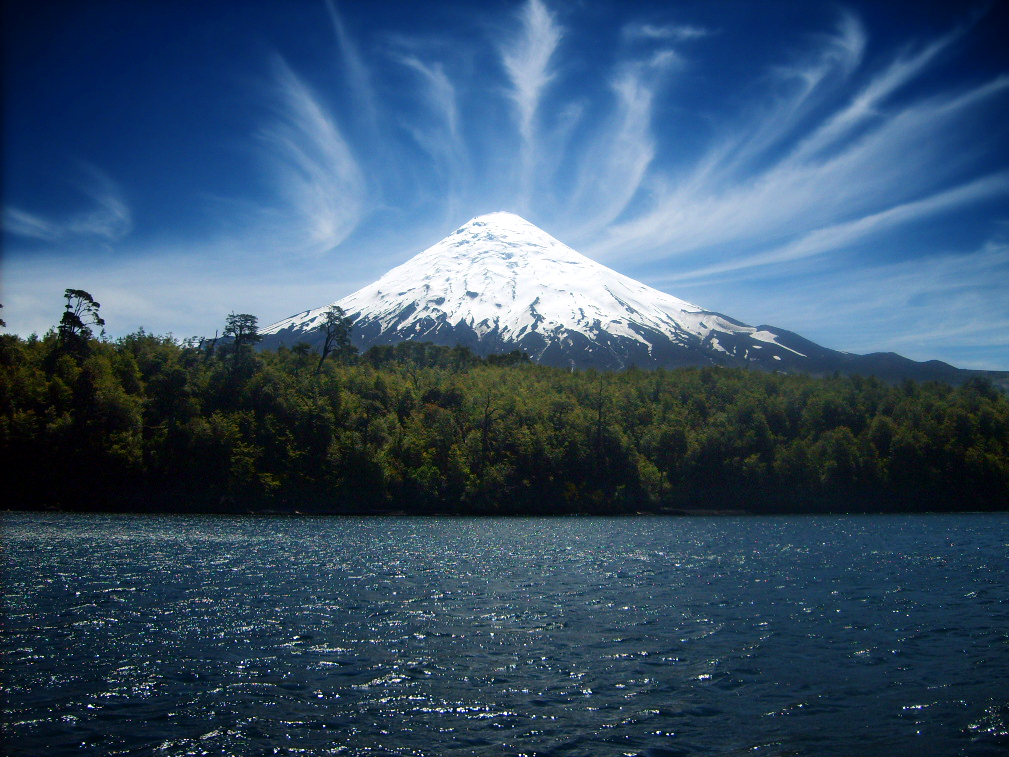
Volcán Villarrica

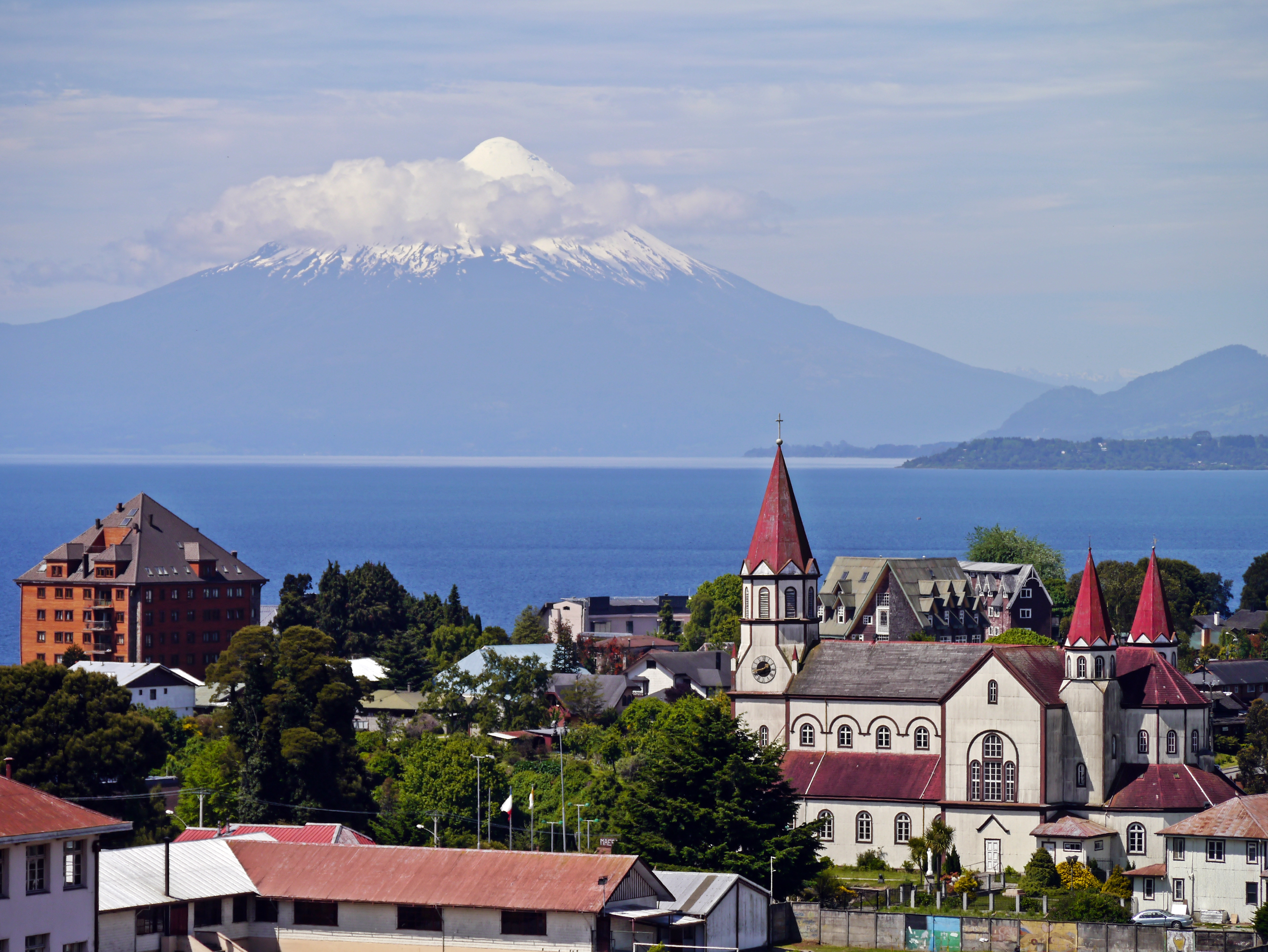
Puerto Varas

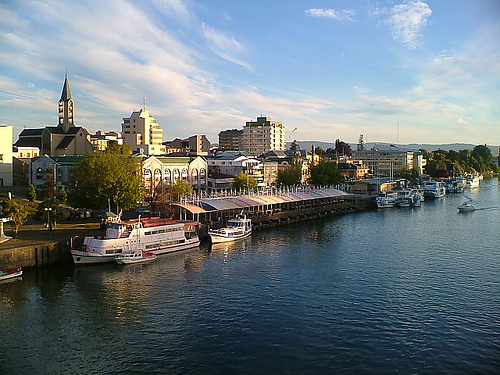
Valdivia

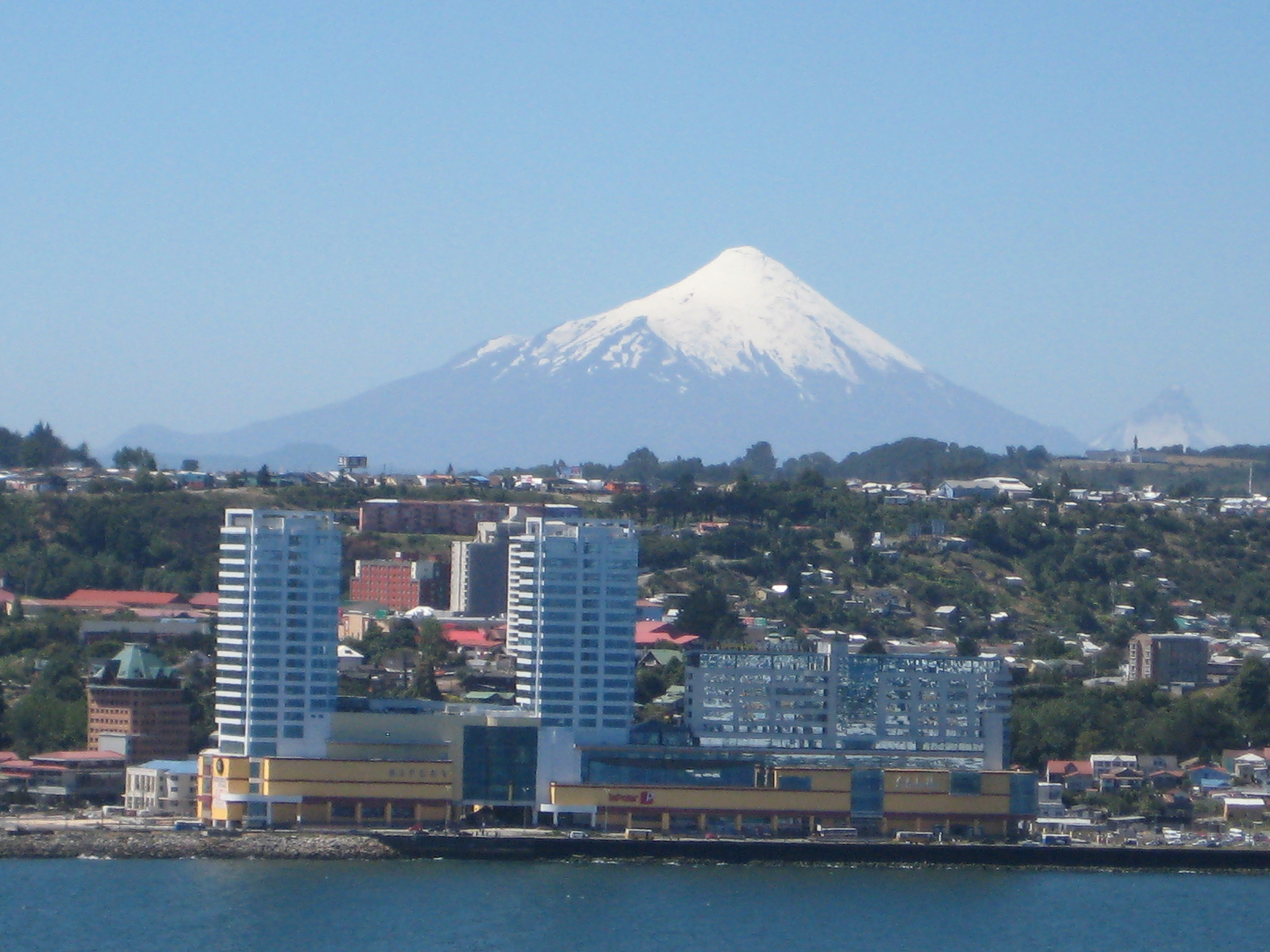
Puerto Montt

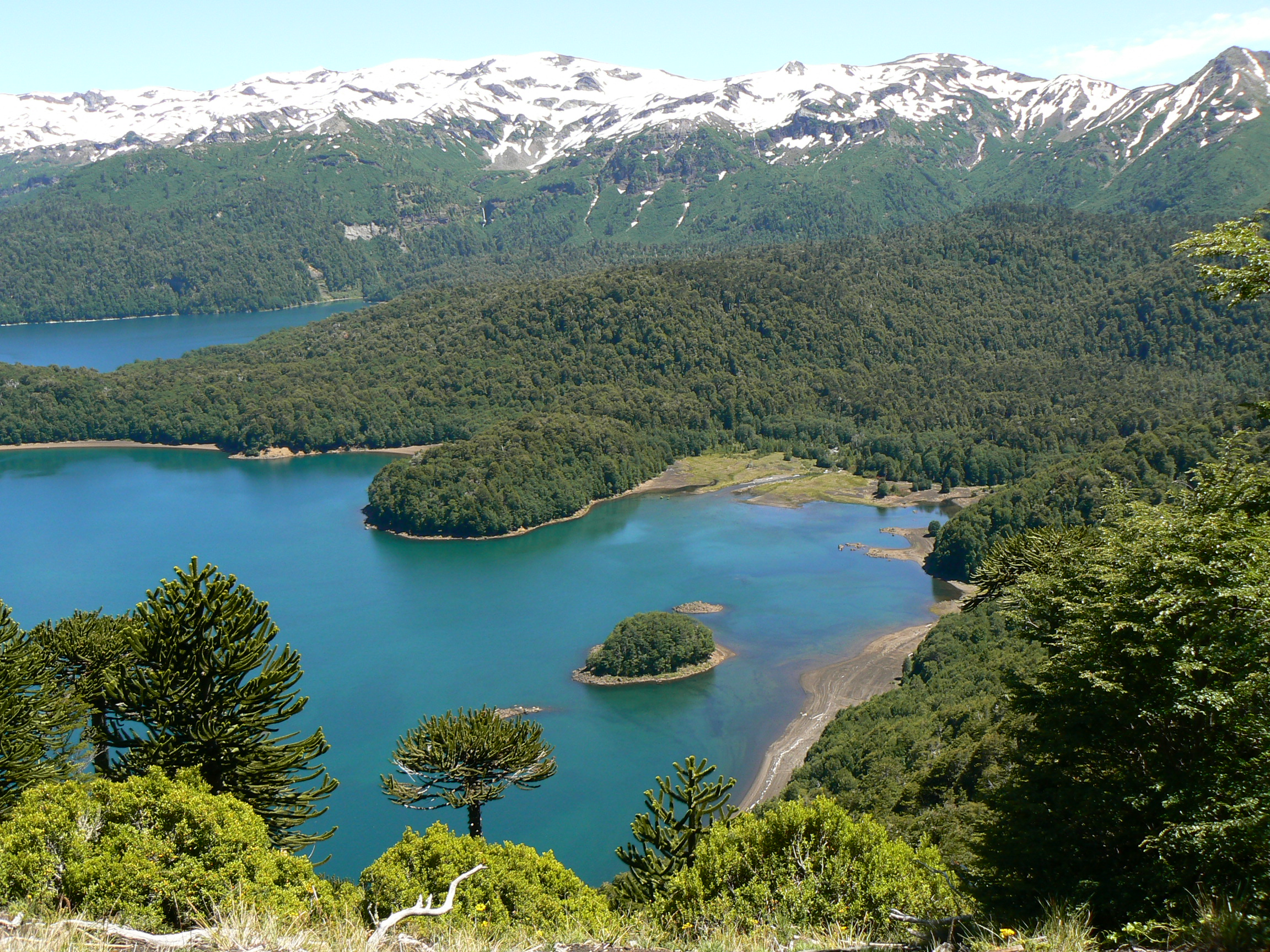
Conguillío National Park

== Zona Austral ==
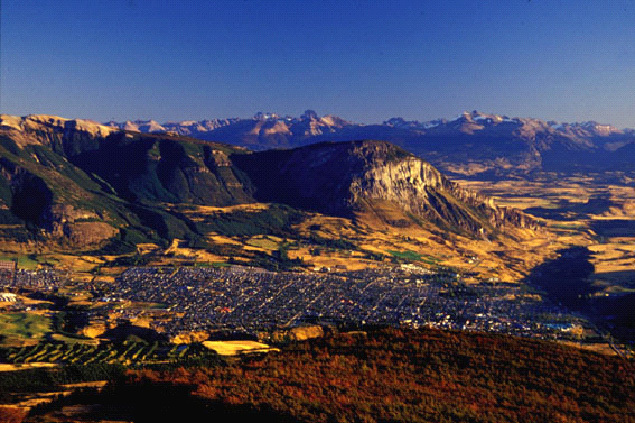
Coyhaique

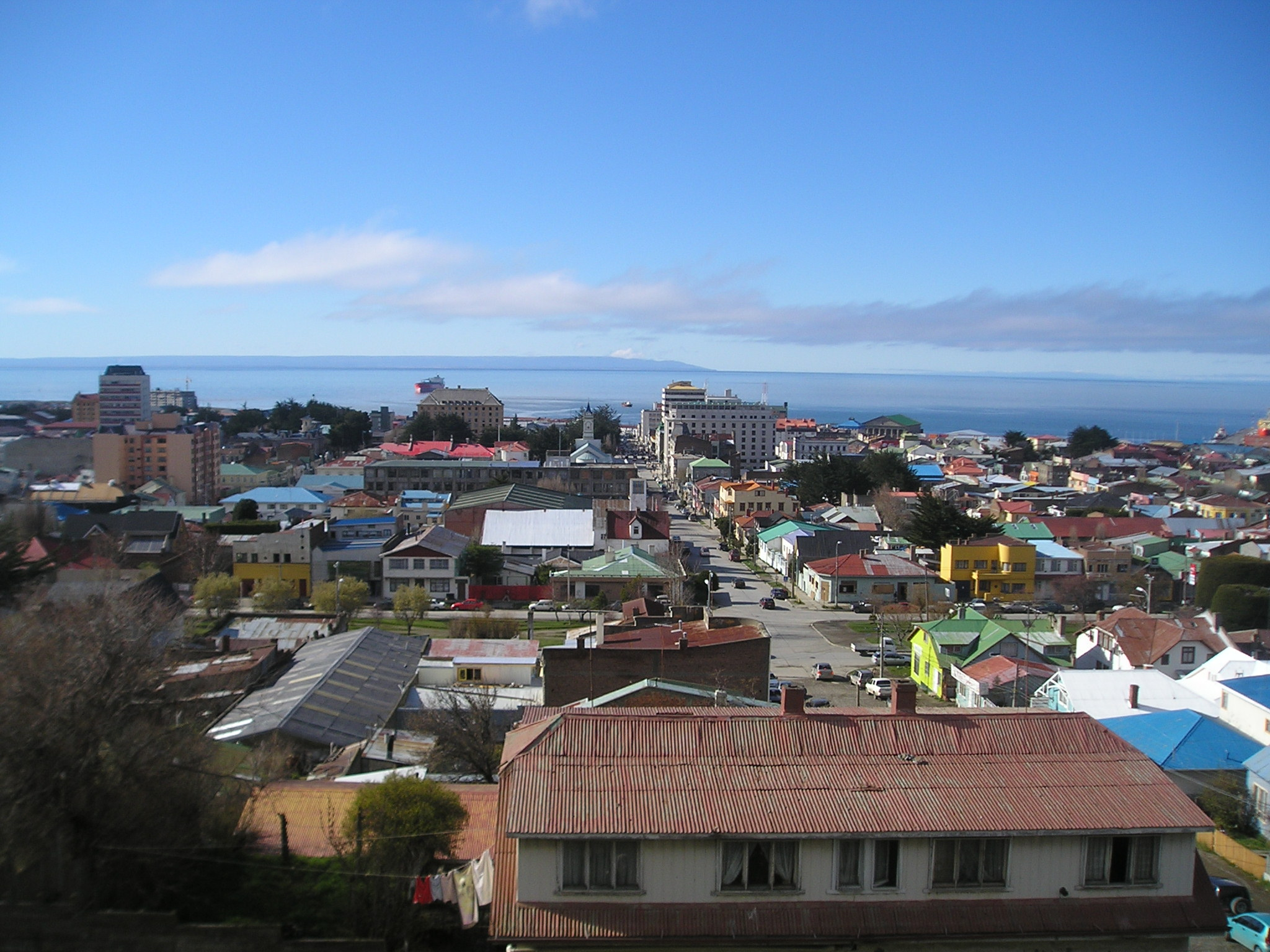
Punta Arenas

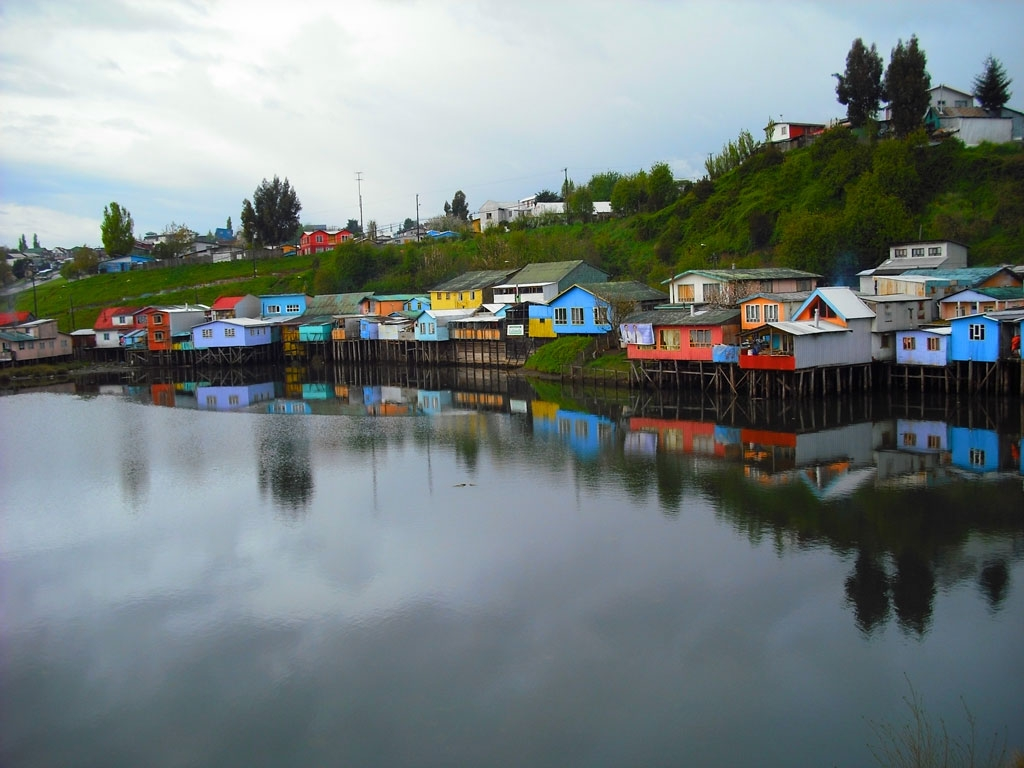
Palafitos in the archipelago of Chiloé

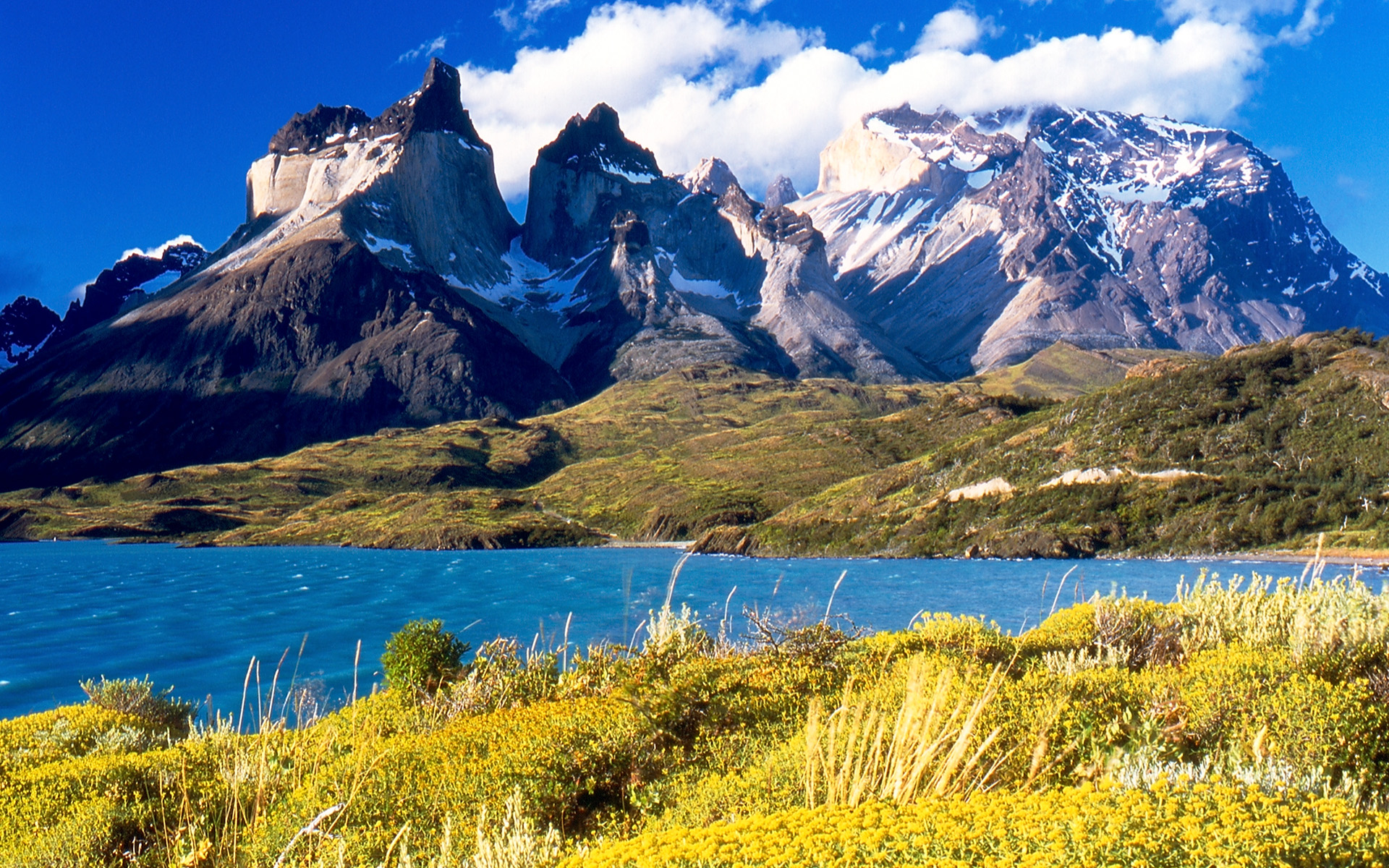
Torres del Paine National Park

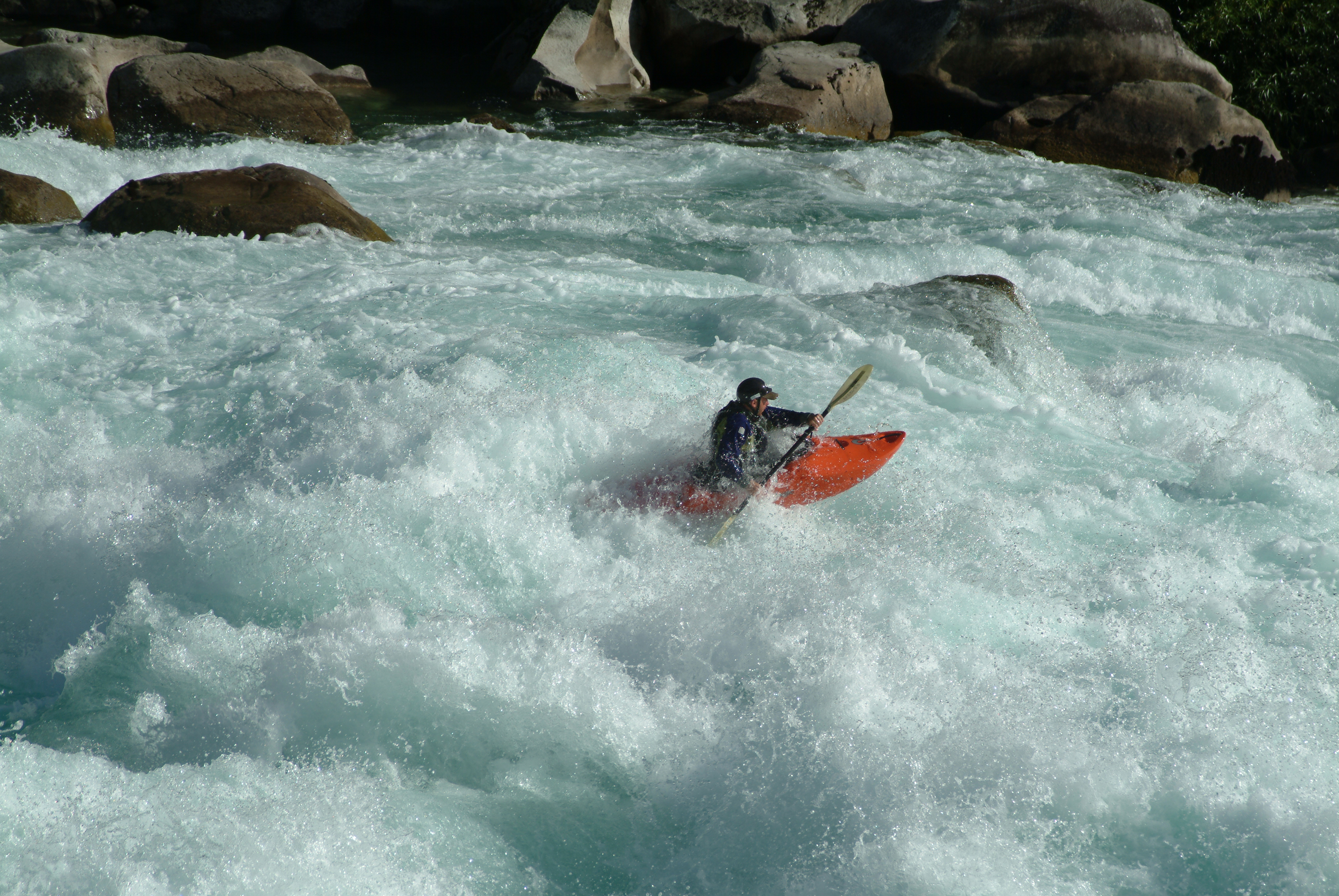
A kayaker runs a rapid on the Futaleufú River

Zona Austral is a premier destination for Ecotourism and Adventure travel. It features countless islands and islets, a maze of steep-sided fjords and channels, large glaciers and icefields and exuberant unspoilt temperate rainforests. Turbulent rivers descend from the Andes, chief of those being the Futaleufú River, which is widely considered one of the world's most challenging rivers for whitewater kayaking and rafting. Other opportunities for outdoor recreation, include hiking, cycling, sea kayaking and flyfishing.

Chiloé is characterized by having a rolling green countryside, but is better known for its peculiar wooden architecture and for its culture, which is full of myths and traditions. Also is remarkable its temperate rainforests.

The scenic Carretera Austral crosses or is nearby to many of the most popular destinations in this portion of Chile. Those include Pumalín Park, Yelcho Lake, Queulat National Park, Cerro Castillo National Reserve, General Carrera Lake and Caleta Tortel.

Laguna San Rafael National Park is the only park where visitors can contemplate at the same time the huge glaciers of Patagonia and the rich diversity of plants of the Valdivian Ecoregion.

Torres del Paine was selected as the eighth wonder of the world in 2013;, one of the most beautiful national parks in the world.

In the ice fields, the Glacier Pío XI (or Brüggen), the longest glacier in the southern hemisphere outside the Antarctic, and one of the few advancing glaciers in the world; and Puerto Williams, the southernmost city in the world

The sprawling glaciers of the Cordillera Darwin, which is contained within Alberto de Agostini National Park, are reachable only by boat. Other typical destinations are Puerto Williams and Cape Horn.

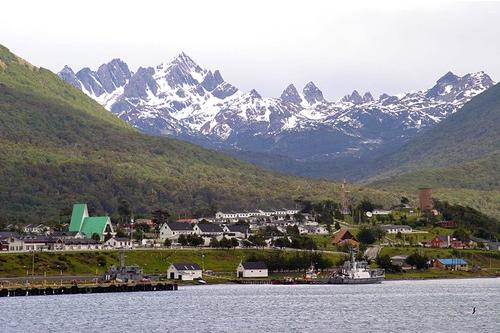
Puerto Williams

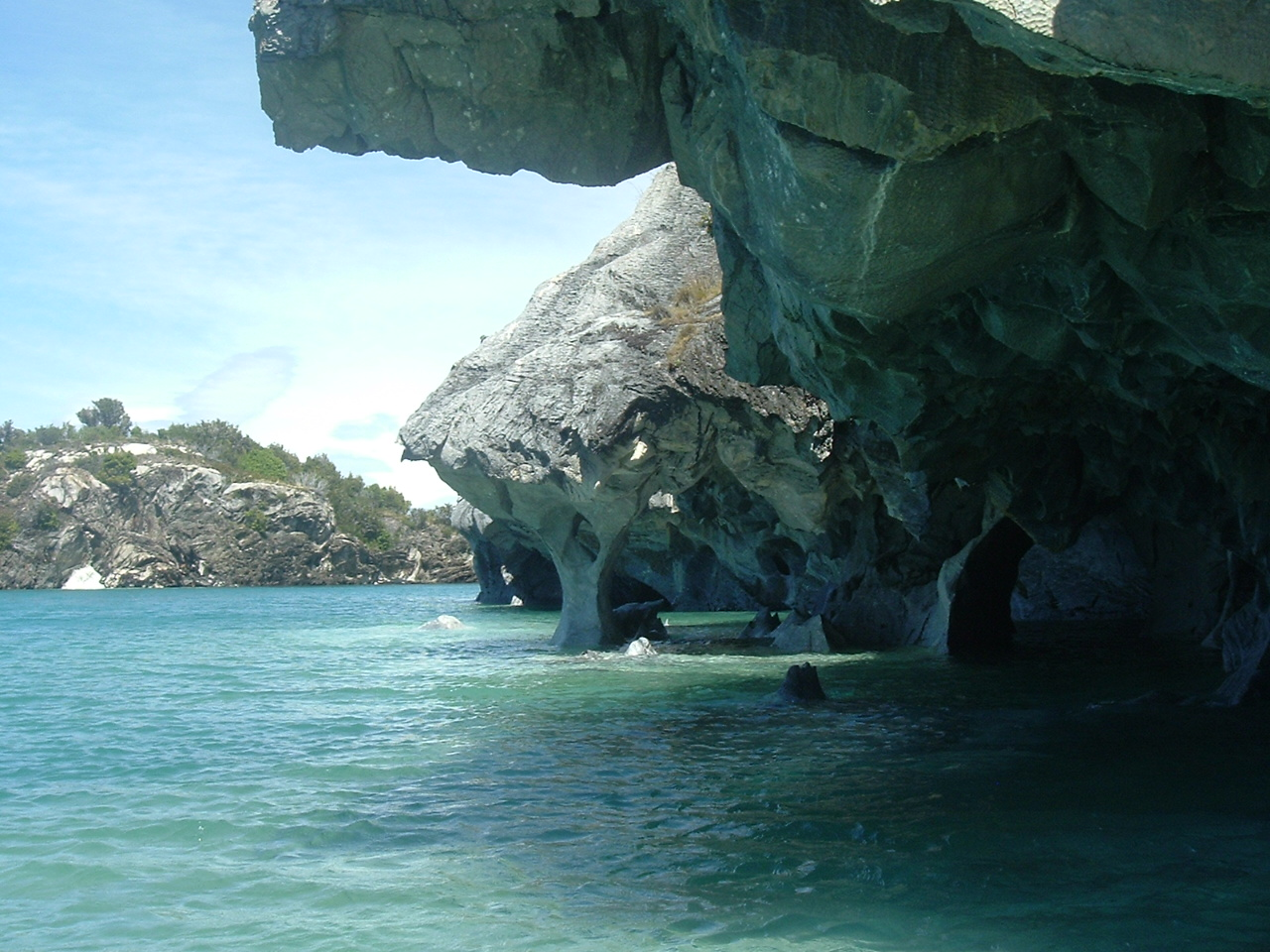
Catedral de Mármol

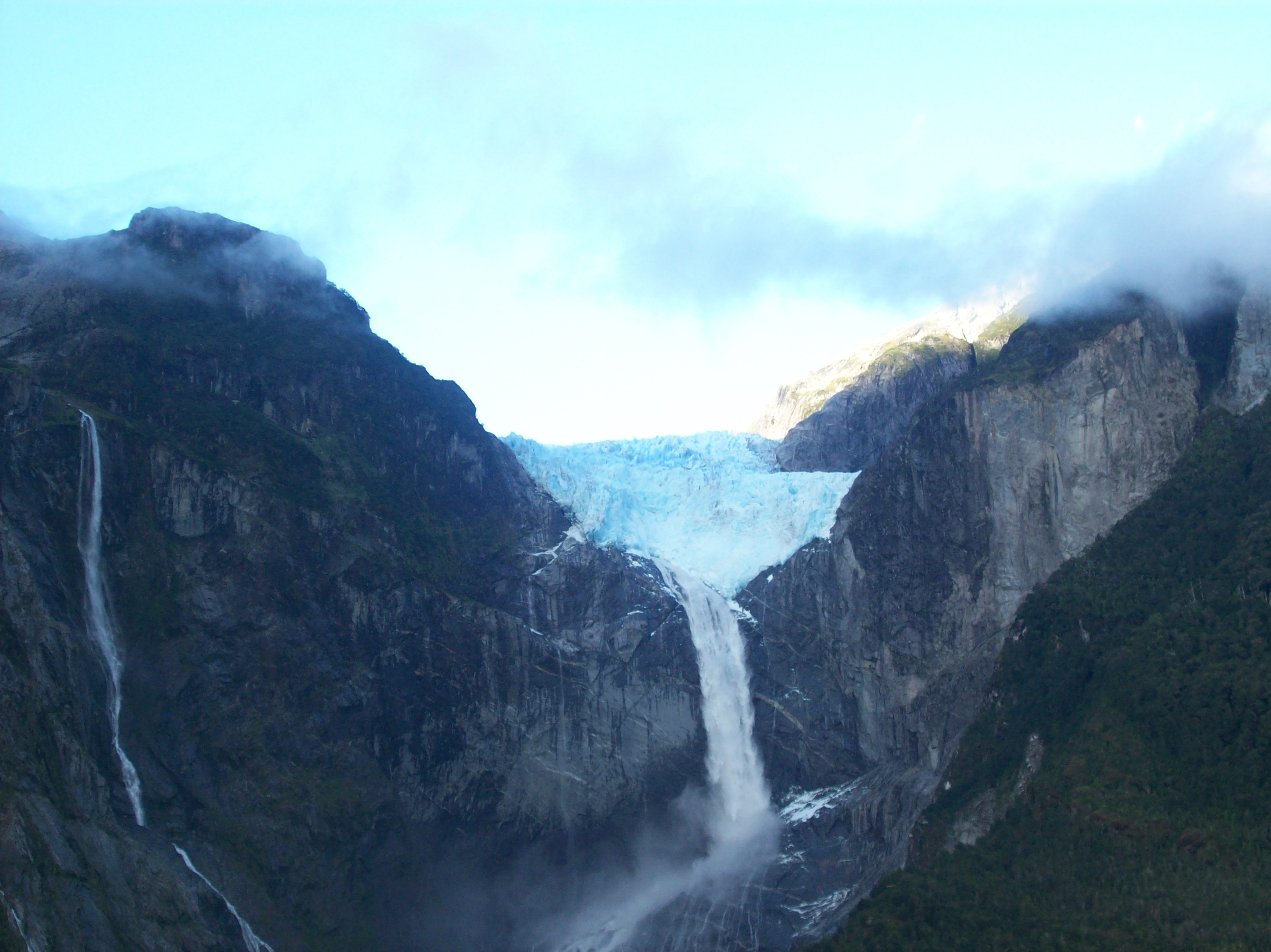
Queulat National Park

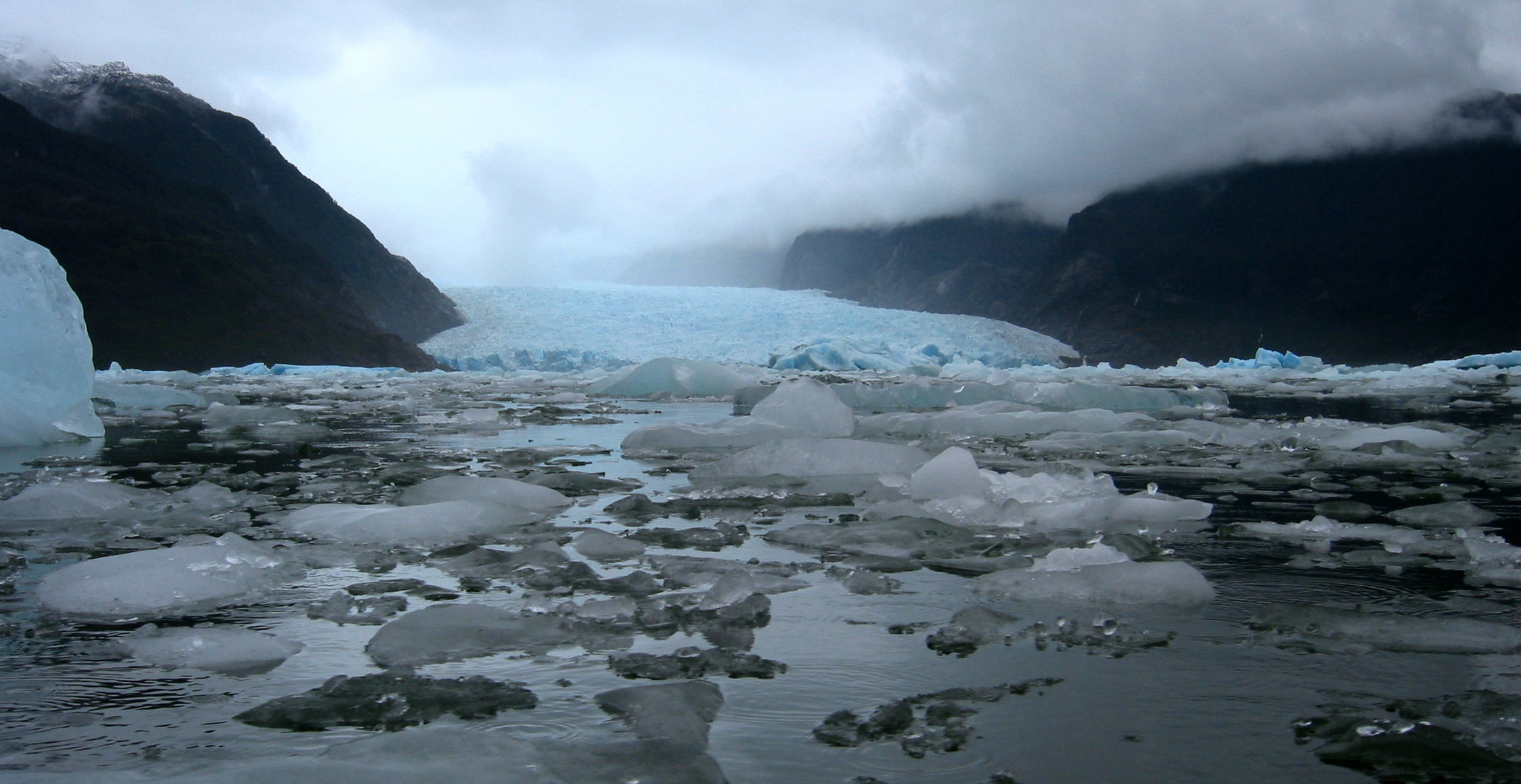
San Rafael Lake

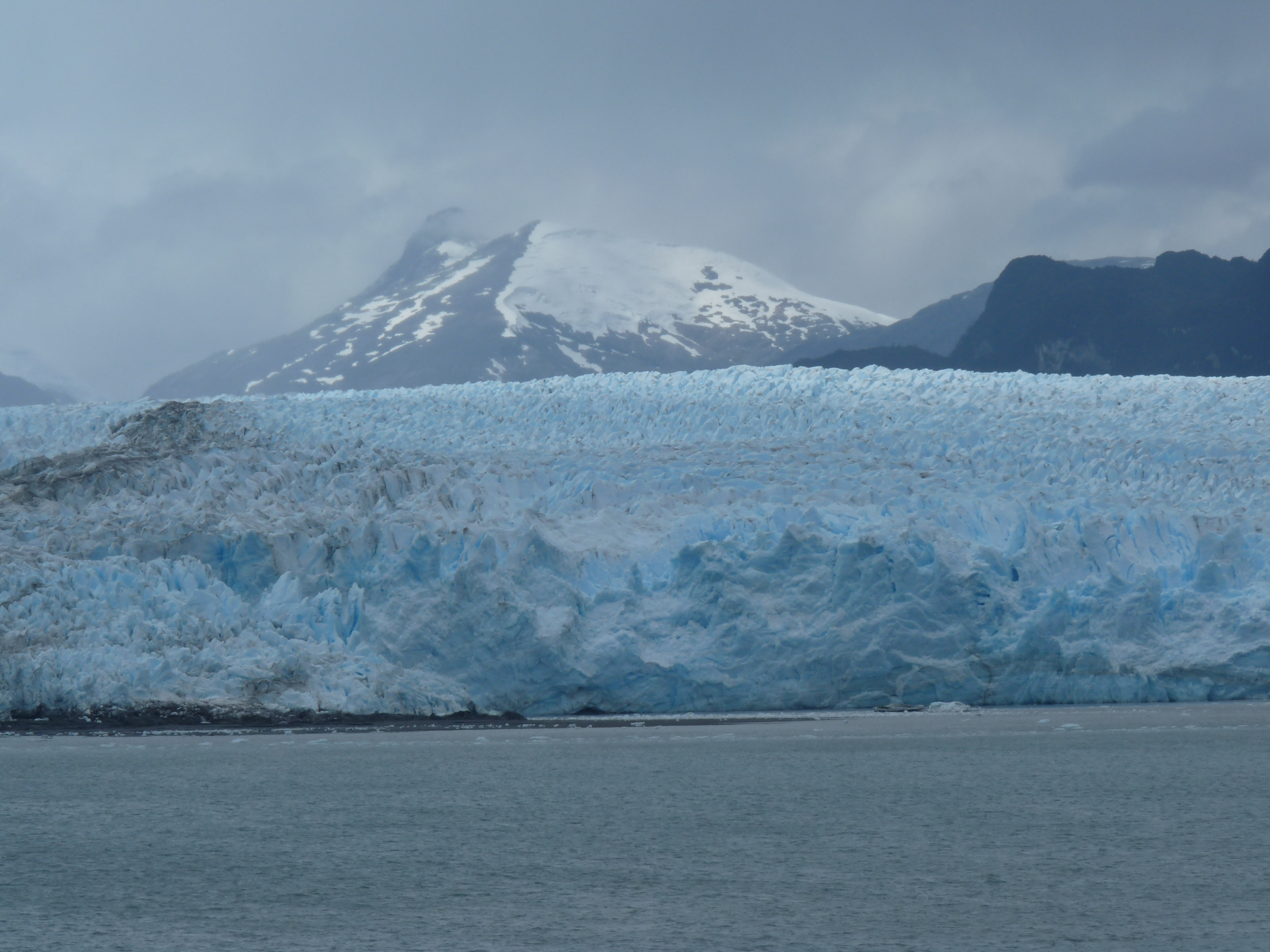
Pío XI or Brüggen Glacier

== Chile insular ==
Easter Island-Rapa Nui paintings of Tangata Manu (Birdmen) Frigate Birds in the "cave of the maneaters"

In the middle of the Pacific Ocean, Easter Island, is world-renowned for its unique cultural and natural heritage. Traditionally called Rapa Nui and previously known as Te pito o te henua ("The navel of the world") and Mata ki te rangi ('eyes looking at the sky'), it is one of the main tourist destinations in Chile because of its natural landscapes and mysterious ancient culture of Rapa Nui people that since time immemorial, developed completely isolated for centuries until it almost became extinct in the mid-19th century. Its most notable feature is the over 1,000 enormous and mysterious statues known as moai, which have been shrouded in mystery since their discovery. To preserve these characteristics, the government has designated, through the National Forestry Corporation (CONAF), the island as Rapa Nui National Park, while UNESCO declared this park as a World Heritage Site in 1995. It is named Easter Island because it was discovered on Easter Sunday in 1722.

Among the activities that can be carried out in Rapa Nui are different excursions and tours, visiting the craft market, the Father Sebastian Englert Anthropological Museum, the ceremonial center Tahai, the quarries of Puna Pau and Rano Raraku, visiting the different ahus on the beaches of Anakena and Ovahe, seeing the archaeological site of Orongo, witnessing shows with music and island dances, and the annual festival Tapati Rapa Nui, the main artistic and cultural activity of the island, where a series of ceremonies and traditions are performed.

The Juan Fernández archipelago is also well known for its jungles and endemic flora, formed by the islands Robinson Crusoe, Santa Clara and Alexander Selkirk. The geological origin of these islands is volcanic and their subtropical weather is rainy. The activities that can be performed are varied, among them hiking, horseback riding, snorkeling, spearfishing, fishing, and observation of flora and fauna, which is mostly endemic. The Juan Fernández Islands are also known for being inhabited by Alexander Selkirk, the man who inspired the novel Robinson Crusoe. The islands were previously named Island Mas Afuera, and Island Mas a Tierra, but in 1966 the Chilean government renamed the Island Más Afuera to Alejandro Selkirk Island and Island Más a Tierra to Robinson Crusoe Island, in order to promote tourism. Incidentally, Selkirk never set foot on Alejandro Selkirk Island, only on Robinson Crusoe Island. The islands can be accessed by air and sea routes.

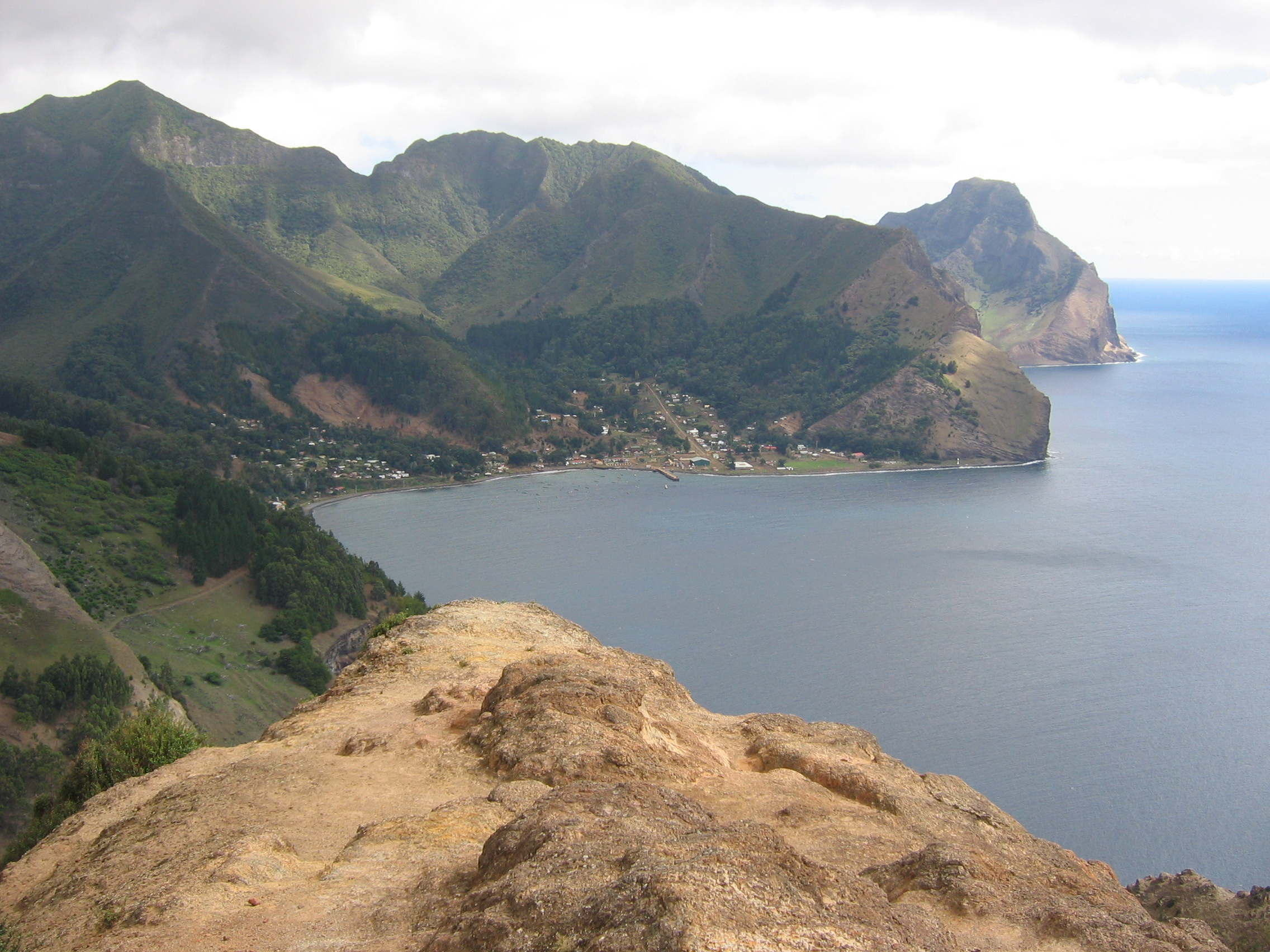
Cumberland Bay, Robinson Crusoe Island

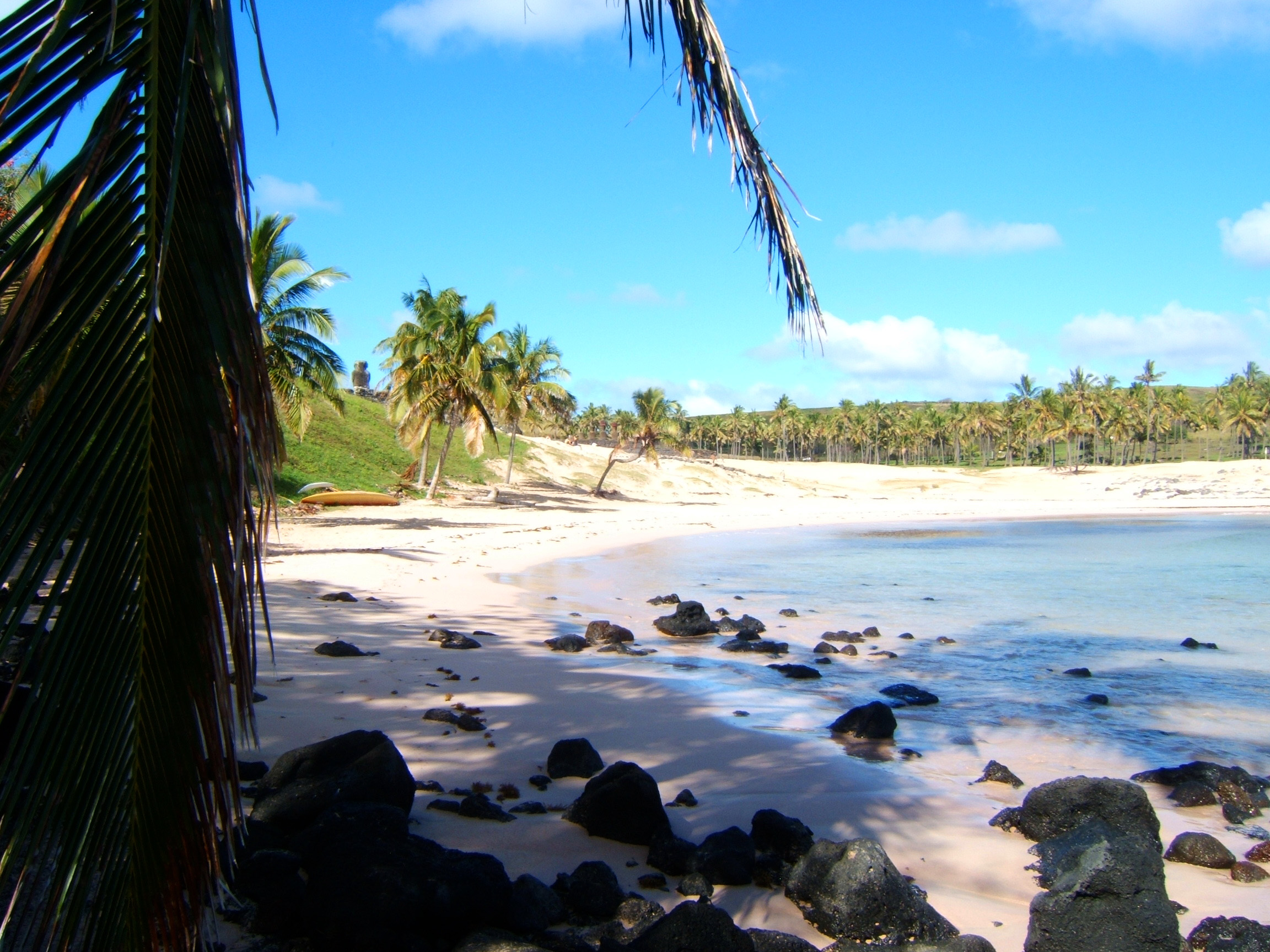
Anakena Beach

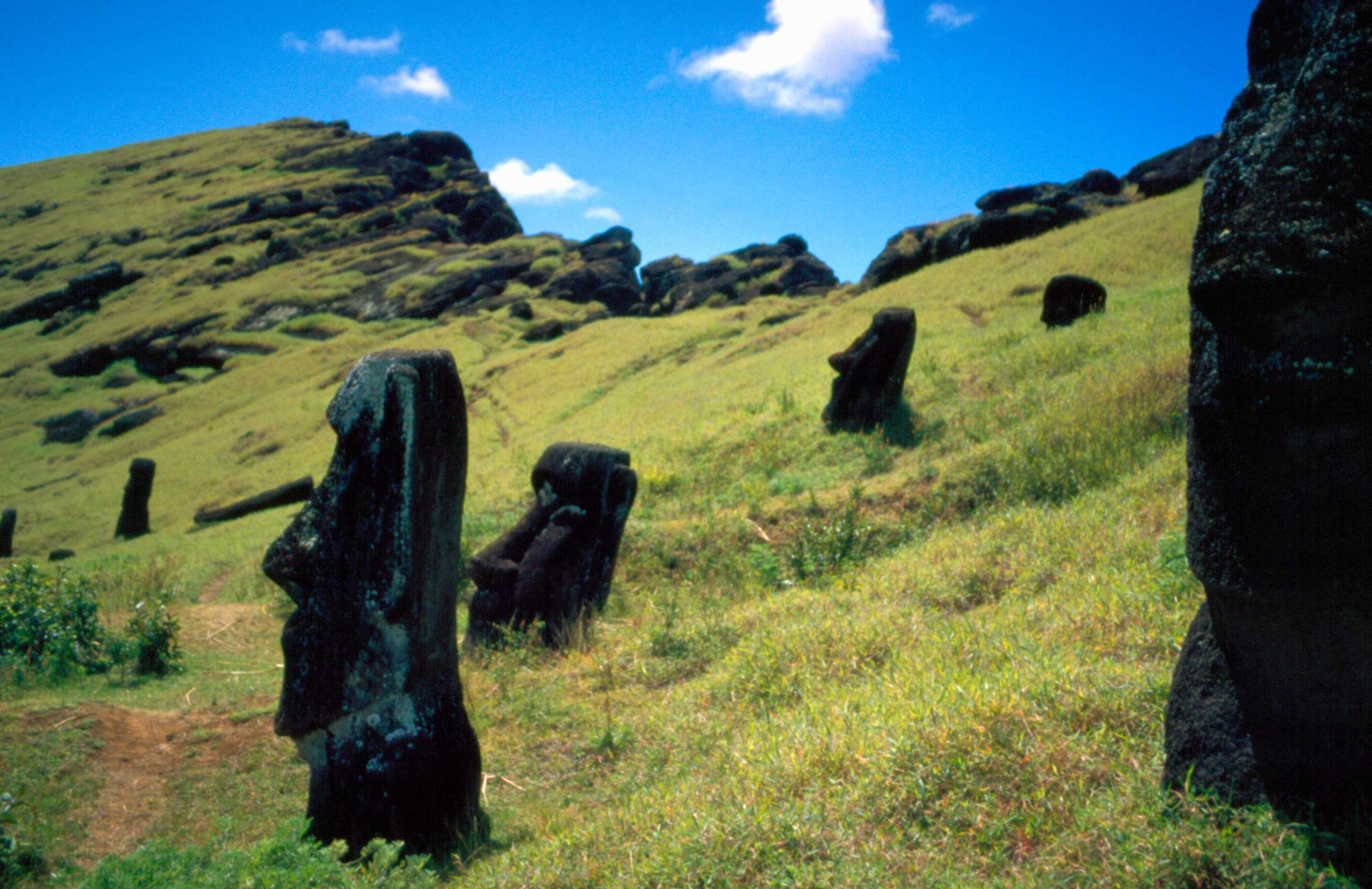
Moais on the slope of Rano Raraku

== Chilean Antarctic Territory ==
According to information gathered by the National Tourism Service (Sernatur), 35,000 tourists visited the Antarctic in the 2012–2013 season, 32% more than in the 2011–2012 season, when it was visited by 26,500 people. 34% of those visitors were Europeans (34%). Of the total percentage of visitors, 5% were from Chile.

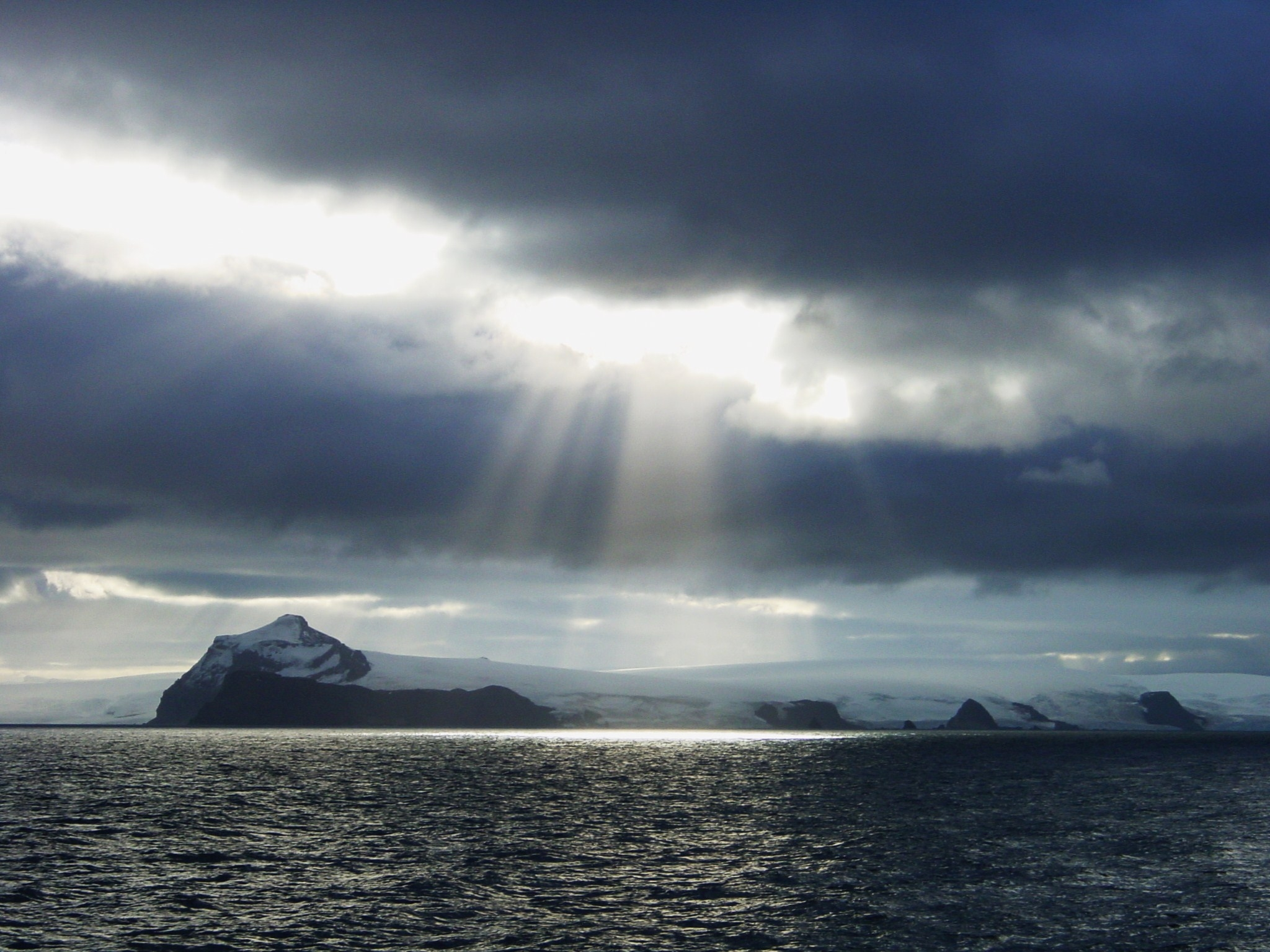
Antarctic Peninsula

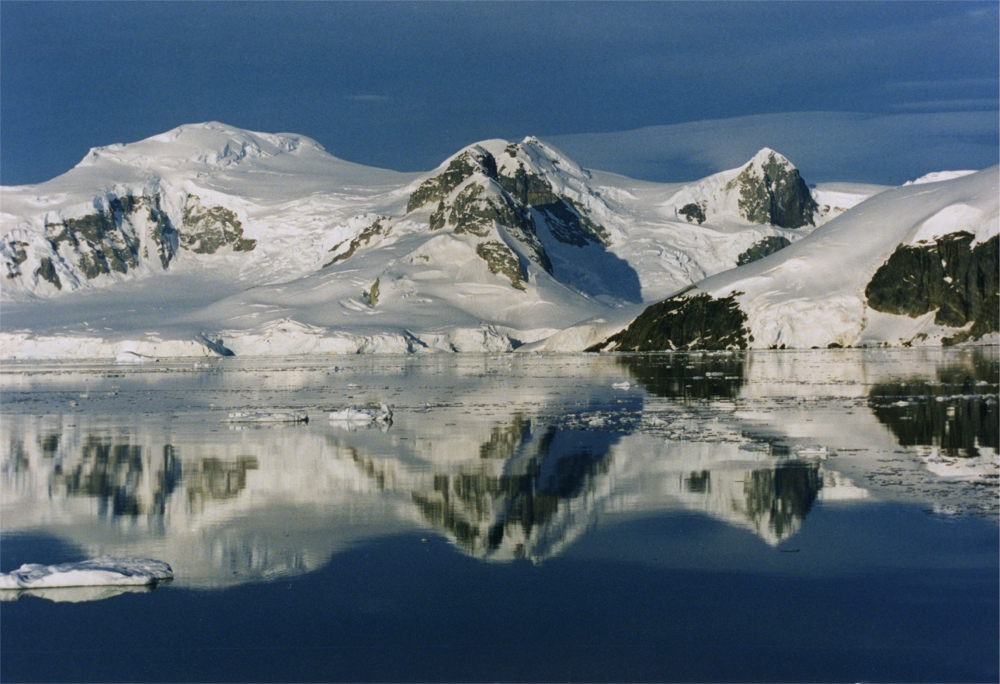
Lemaire channel

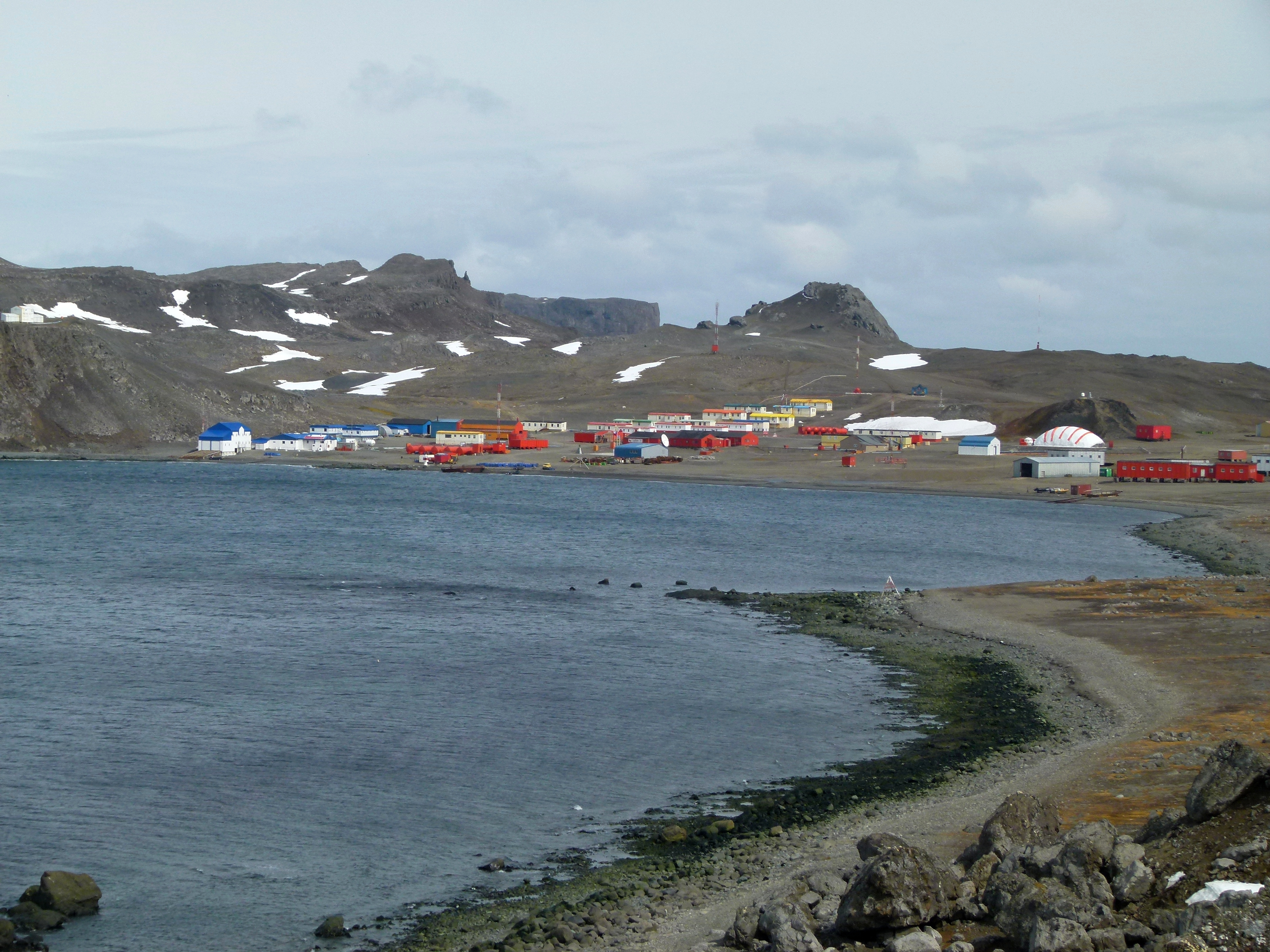
Villa Las Estrellas

== Winter tourism ==
In Chile from June to September it is possible to practice winter sports, especially skiing and snowboarding During the Andes, between the regions of Valparaíso and Magallanes and Chilean Antarctica, there are eighteen ski resorts of international quality, as Portillo, the oldest ski resort in South America and home to the FIS Alpine World Ski Championships 1966, and Valle Nevado, which has one of the largest ski areas in South America

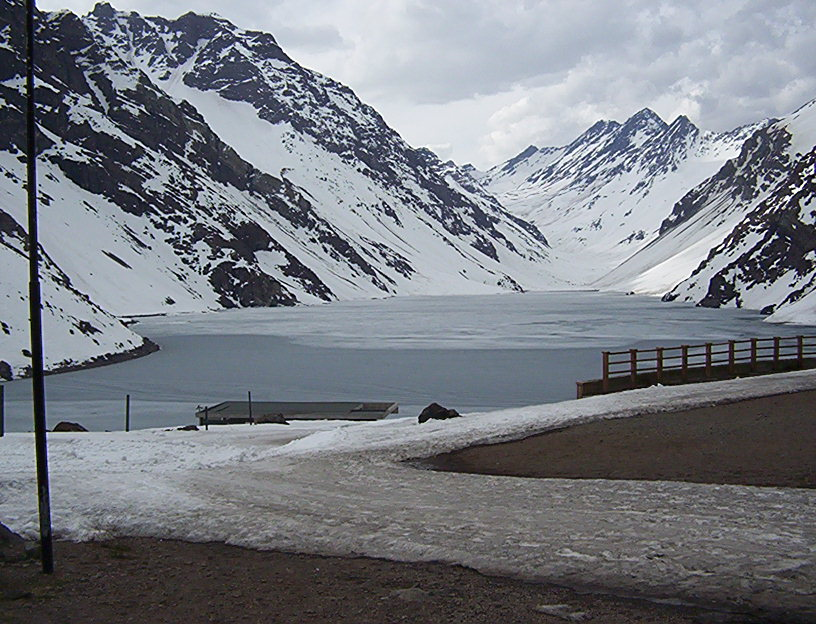
Laguna del Inca, Portillo

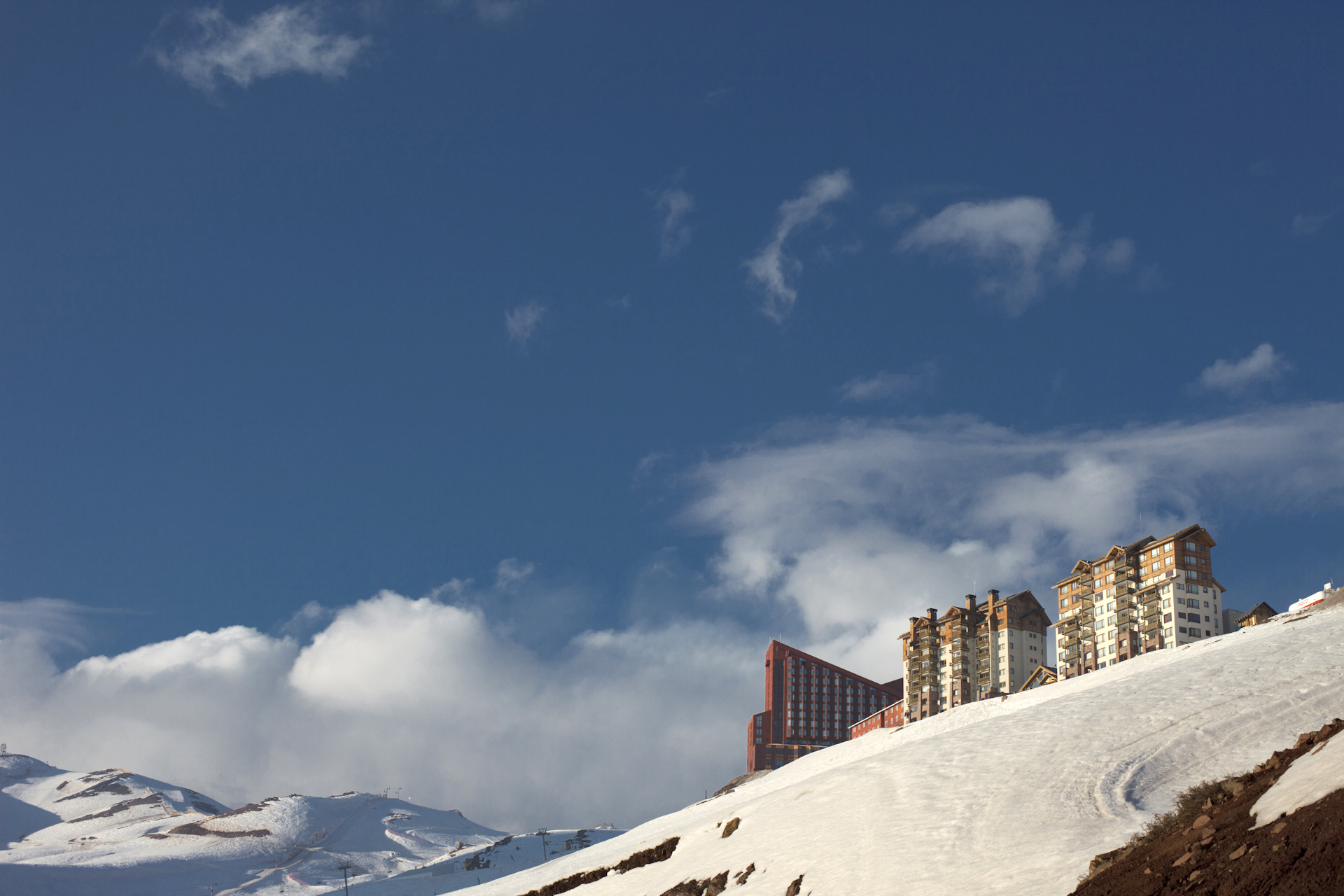
Valle Nevado

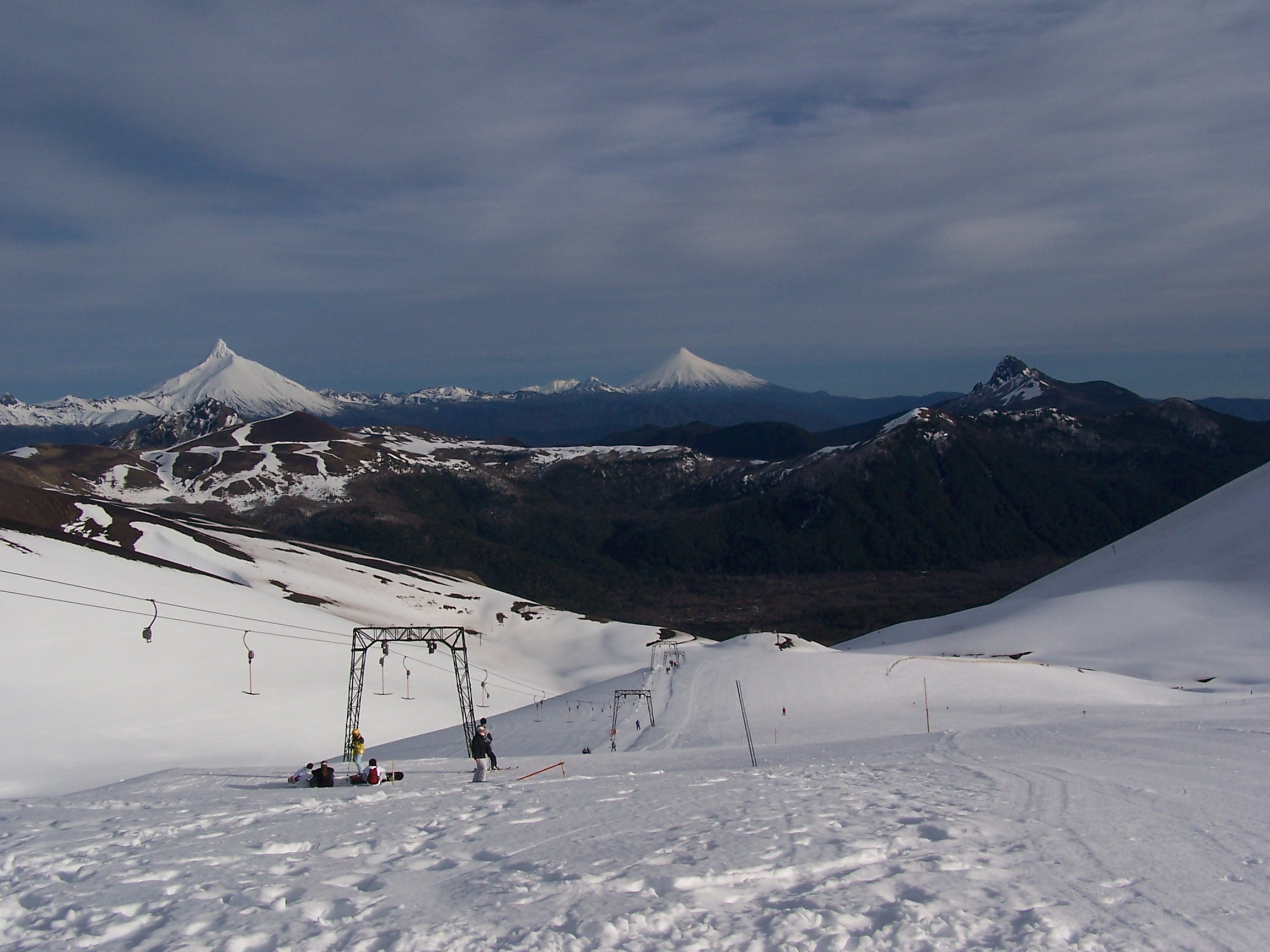
Antillanca

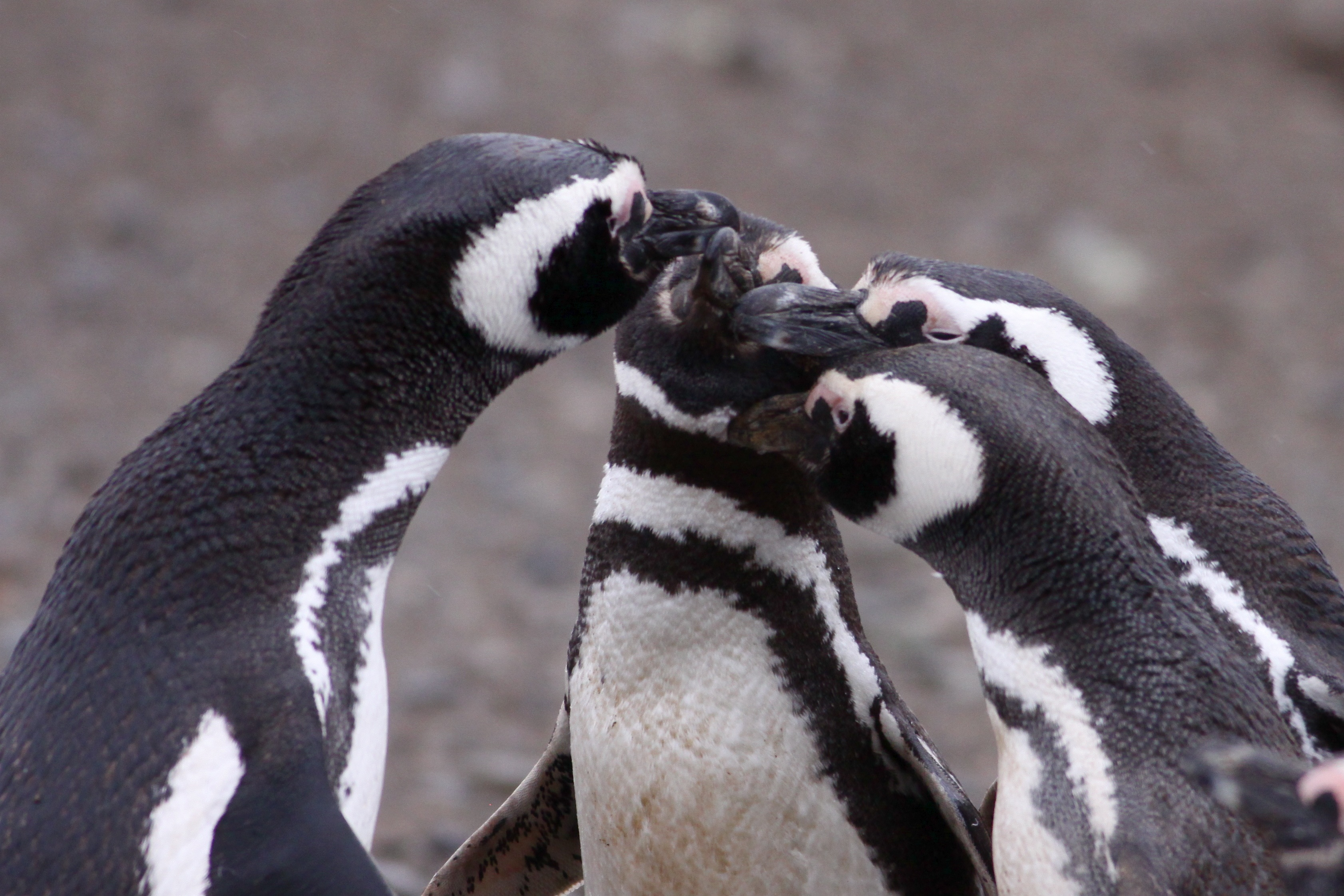
Magellanic Penguins in Magdalena.

== World Heritage Sites in Chile ==
As part of the cultural heritage of Chile, there are buildings, objects and sites of archaeological, nature, architecture, handicraft, artistic, ethnographic, folk, historical, religious or technological scattered throughout the Chilean territory. Among them are those assets declared World Heritage by UNESCO, in accordance with the provisions of the convention the Protection of the World Cultural and Natural Heritage, of 1972, ratified by Chile in 1980. These cultural sites are:

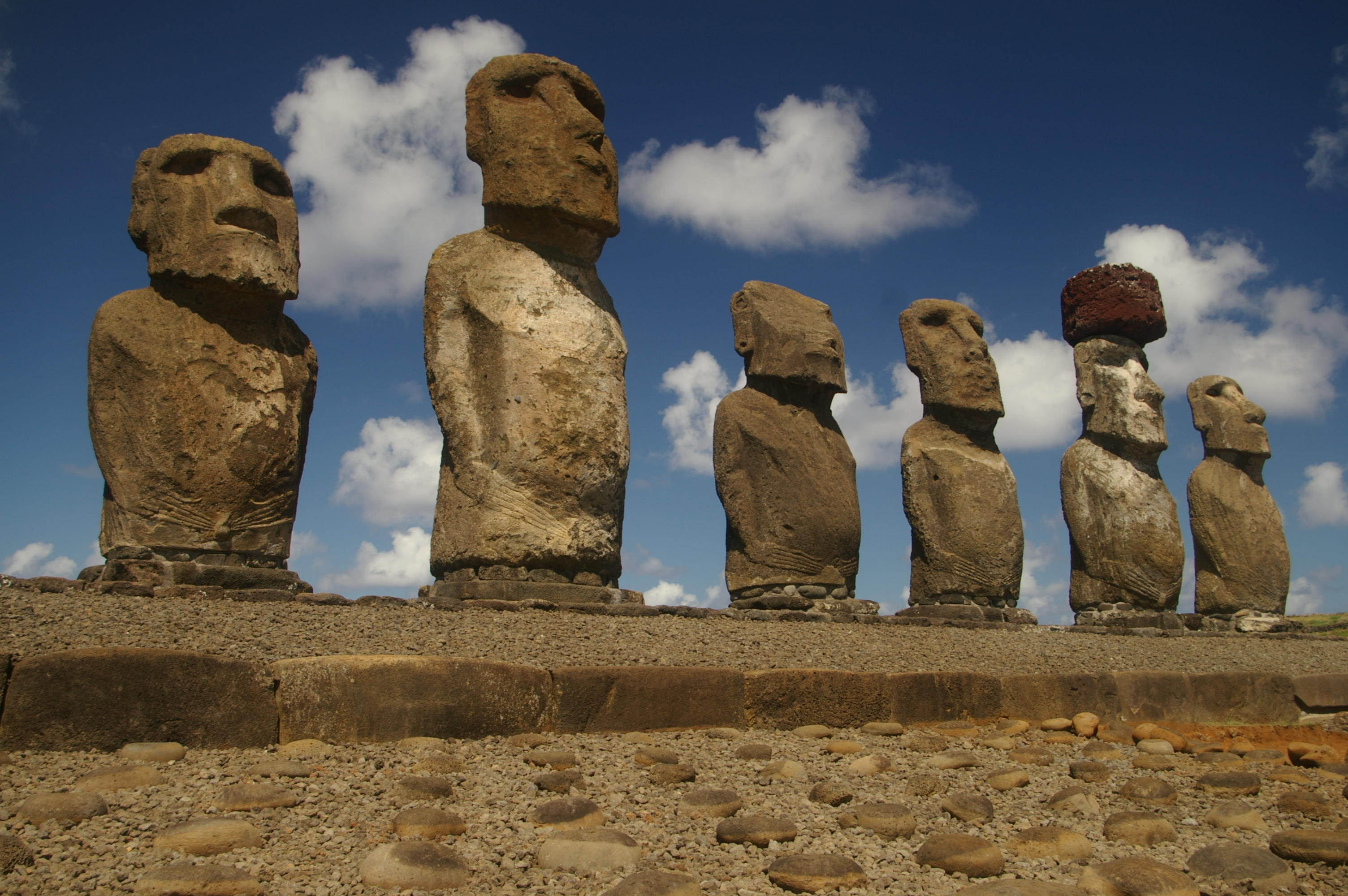
Rapa Nui National Park

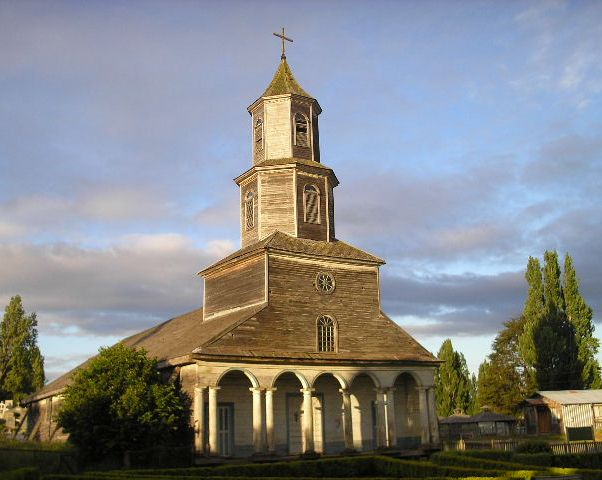
Churches of Chiloé

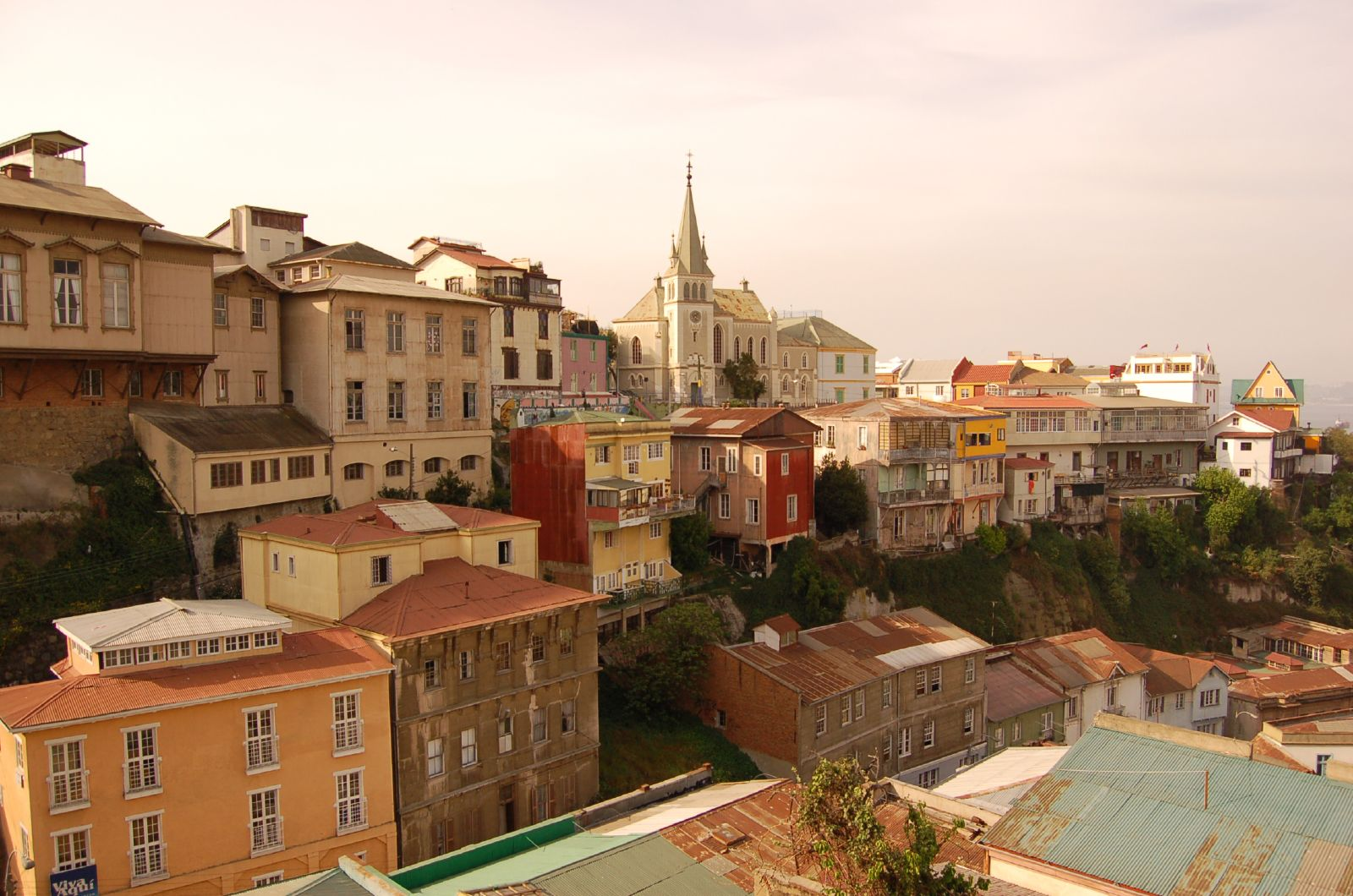
Valparaíso

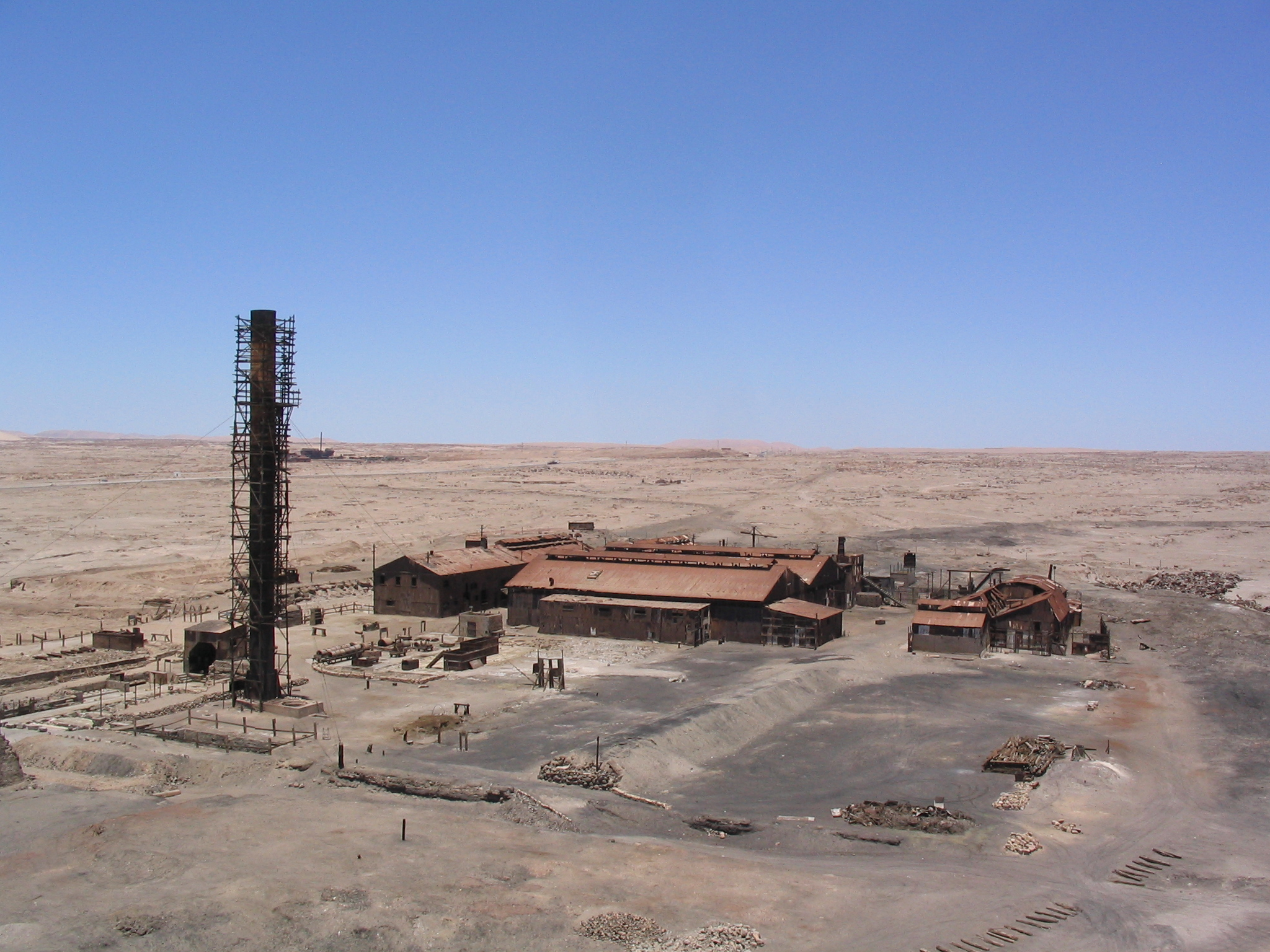
Humberstone and Santa Laura Saltpeter Works

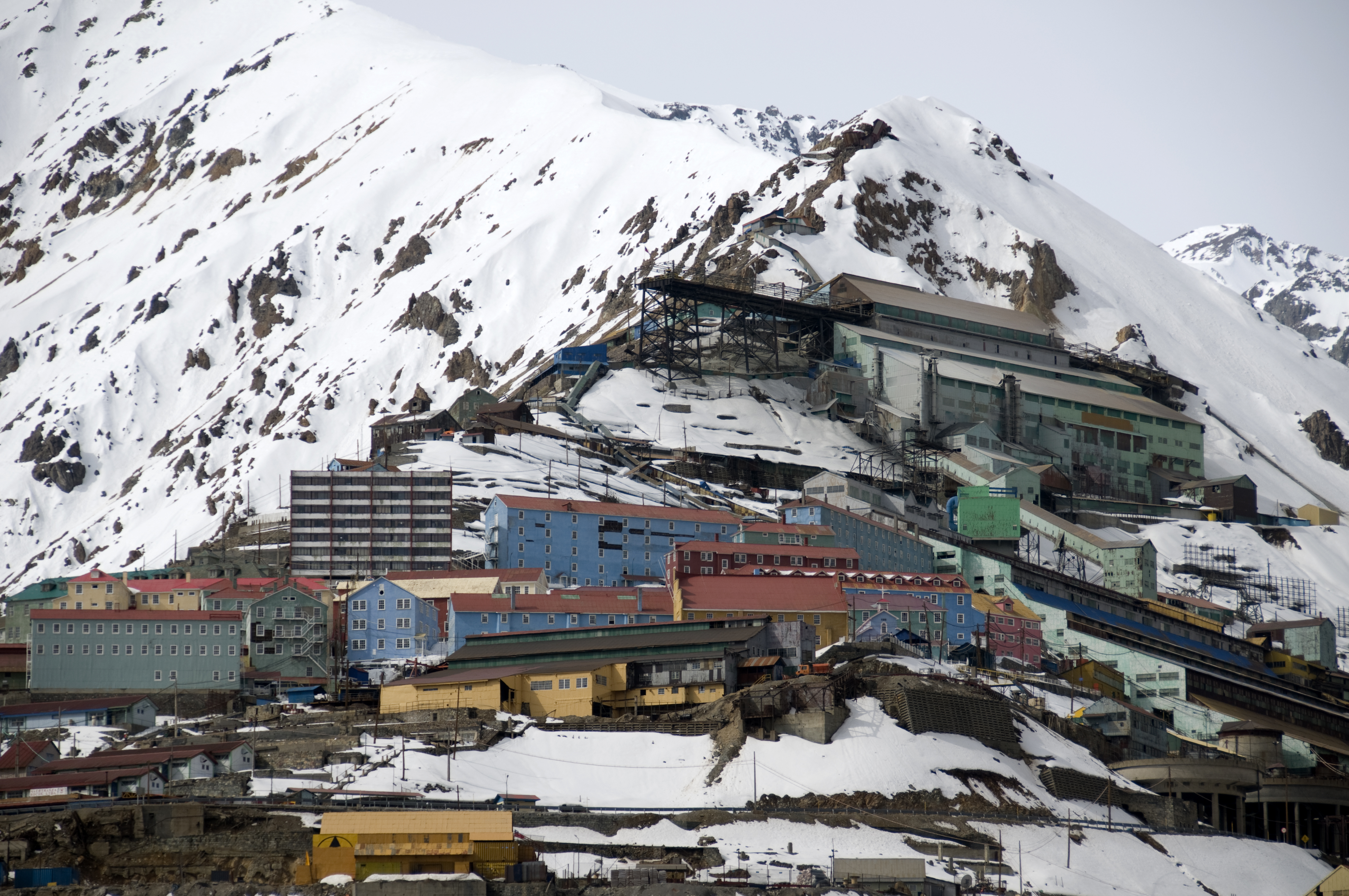
Sewell Mining Town

== Ethical Traveler Destination ==
Chile was included in the 2010, 2011 and 2012 lists of "The Developing World's 10 Best Ethical Destinations" complied by the magazine Ethical Traveler. These lists were compiled based on metrics such as environmental protection, social welfare, and human rights.

== Touristic projects ==
Within Bicentennial projects, the National Tourism Service (Sernatur), a dependent entity of the Ministry of Economy, Development and Tourism, launched in 2011 the first circuit of the touristic project "Rutas Chile", which aims to bring "more distinctive elements [...] in geographical matters, cultural, heritage and tourism [integrating] fundamental elements of national identity, the presence of featured tourist products [...] and the existence of road structure." These tourist routes cover the fifteen regions of Chile and are formed according to a main theme, which is determined by the contents available along the route.

In the table below are named the eleven tourist circuits and the corresponding regions of Chile, in ISO code.

Tourist circuits of Chile
| «Chile routes» | AP | TA | AN | AT | CO | VS | MR | LI | ML | BI | AR | LR | LL | AI | MA |
|---|---|---|---|---|---|---|---|---|---|---|---|---|---|---|---|
| «Route of the desert» | Yes | Yes | Yes | Yes | | | | | | | | | | | |
| «Route of the stars» | | | | | Yes | | | | | | | | | | |
| «Route of the sea» | | | | | | Yes | | | | | | | | | |
| «Capital route» | | | | | | | Yes | | | | | | | | |
| «Great route of the wine» | | | | | Yes | Sí | Yes | Sí | Yes | | | | | | |
| «Route of the coves» | | | | | | | | | Yes | | | | | | |
| «Native route» | | | | | | | | | | Yes | Yes | | | | |
| «Route of the interlakes» | | | | | | | | | | | Yes | Yes | Yes | | |
| «Route of the islands» | | | | | | Yes | | | | | | | Yes | | |
| «Austral adventure route» | | | | | | | | | | | | | | Yes | |
| «Route of the Chilean Patagonia» | | | | | | | | | | | | | | | Yes |

== Hotel industry ==
The availability of hotel beds reaches over 22,500 in Santiago. According to Sernatur, and according to services they offer and the requirements with which they comply, there are ten five star hotels in Chile. Ordered from north to south, those hotels are:

- Hotel Gavina in Iquique.
- Hotel Desierto in Antofagasta.
- Hotel del Mar in Viña del Mar.
- Hotel Kennedy in Santiago.
- Hotel Plaza San Francisco in Santiago.
- Hotel Regal Pacific in Santiago.
- Hotel Santa Cruz Plaza in Santa Cruz.
- Hotel Termas de Puyehue Wellness & Spa in Puyehue.
- Hotel Cumbres Patagónicas in Puerto Varas.
- Hotel Patagónico in Puerto Varas.

== See also ==
- Hiking in Chile
- Visa policy of Chile
- The Chilean Inca Trail
- Chilean passport
- Public holidays in Chile
