= Caleta Hornos =

Caleta Los Hornos
- Town
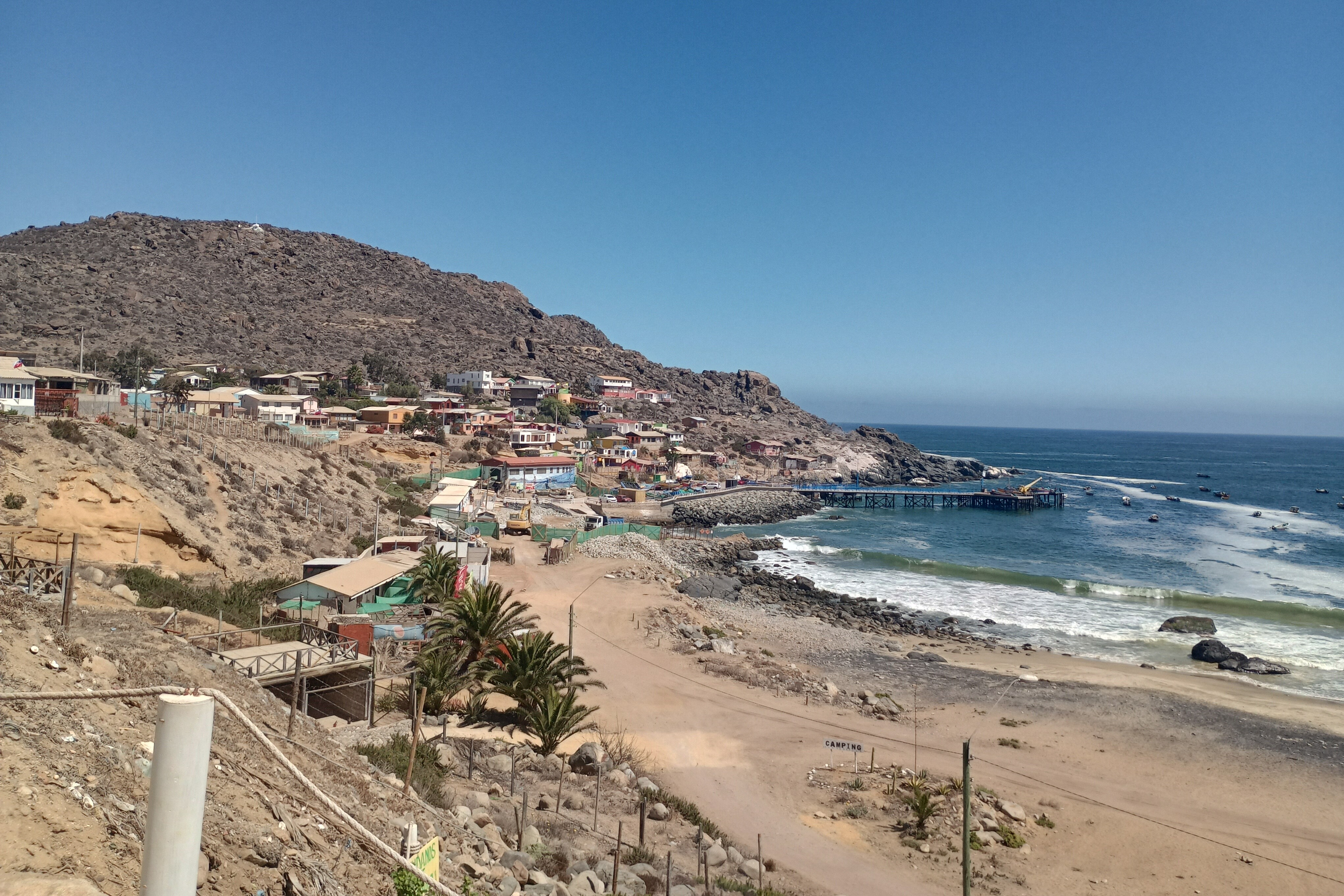
- View of Caleta Los Hornos

- Coat of arms Location in Chile
- Coordinates: 29°30′S 71°16′W
- Country: Chile
- Region: Coquimbo
- Province: Elqui
- Seat: La Higuera

Area
  - Total: 61.9 km^{2} (23.9 sq mi)

Sex
- Time zone: UTC-4 (CLT)
  - Summer (DST): UTC-3 (CLST)
- Area code: 56 +
- Website: munilahiguera.cl

Caleta Los Hornos is a seaside town in the commune of La Higuera, in Elqui Province, in the extreme north of the Coquimbo Region, Chile. It is bordered on the west by the Pacific Ocean, on the north by the Atacama Region and lies 36 kilometres north of the city of La Serena on the Ruta 5 Norte highway.

The population of the town is dispersed along the coastline, with fishing a major source of income. The place is also a tourist destination, with visitors coming for the coastal setting and recreational fishing.

== Caleta Los Hornos as a tourist destination ==
Beaches

The town has with two beaches, Caleta Los Hornos and Despensa, located about 200 metres apart.

Sea life

The cold waters of Humboldt Current bring dry weather and low precipitation to the land, and marine nutrients to the seas, making Caleta Los Hornos a diverse marine environment. These conditions make it suitable for shore fishing and rock fishing.

Flowering desert

The flowering desert (Spanish: desierto florido) is a climatic phenomenon that occurs in the Chilean Atacama Desert. The phenomenon consists of the blossoming of a variety of flowers between the months of September and November in years when rainfall is unusually high. This phenomenon occurs in the surroundings of Caleta Los Hornos, along scattered points through the Atacama Desert.

Cuisine

The marine life makes Caleta Los Hornos a good place to buy locally caught seafood. As is common in Chile, it is possible to eat fresh seafood at the market itself.

=== Nearby places ===
- Punta Colorada: Formerly a railway station, Punta Colorada is now a rural town where the main income comes from breeding of goats. Near Punta Colorada it is possible to observe a colony of burrowing parrots.
- Pingüino de Humboldt National Reserve is a nature reserve located a short distance off the coast of mainland Chile. It consists of three islands: Chañaral, Damas and Choros. It is located about 100 km (62 mi) north of La Serena in the Coquimbo Region of Chile and has a total area of 859.3 hectares (2,123 acres). The reserve is a breeding site for the Humboldt penguin, for which it is named, and is a habitat for sea lions and bottlenose dolphins, chunchungos, Magellanic penguins, sea turtles, whales, albatrosses and cormorants.
- Totoralillo Norte: 40 km north of Caleta Los Hornos is this former mining shipping port, today transformed into an artisanal fishing village.
- Los Choros: Is a village with about 300 inhabitants, and site of the San Jose church, built in 1600.

== See also ==
- La Higuera, Chile
- Flowering desert (Chile)
- Pingüino de Humboldt National Reserve
- Coquimbo Region
