= Pisco Elqui =

- Village
- Interactive map of Pisco Elqui
- Coordinates: 30°07′25″S 70°29′36″W
- Country: Chile
- Region: Coquimbo
- Province: Elqui Province
- Commune: Pisco Elqui
- Elevation: 1,300 m (4,300 ft)

Population (2017 Census)
  - Total: 868
- Time zone: UTC−4 (CLT)

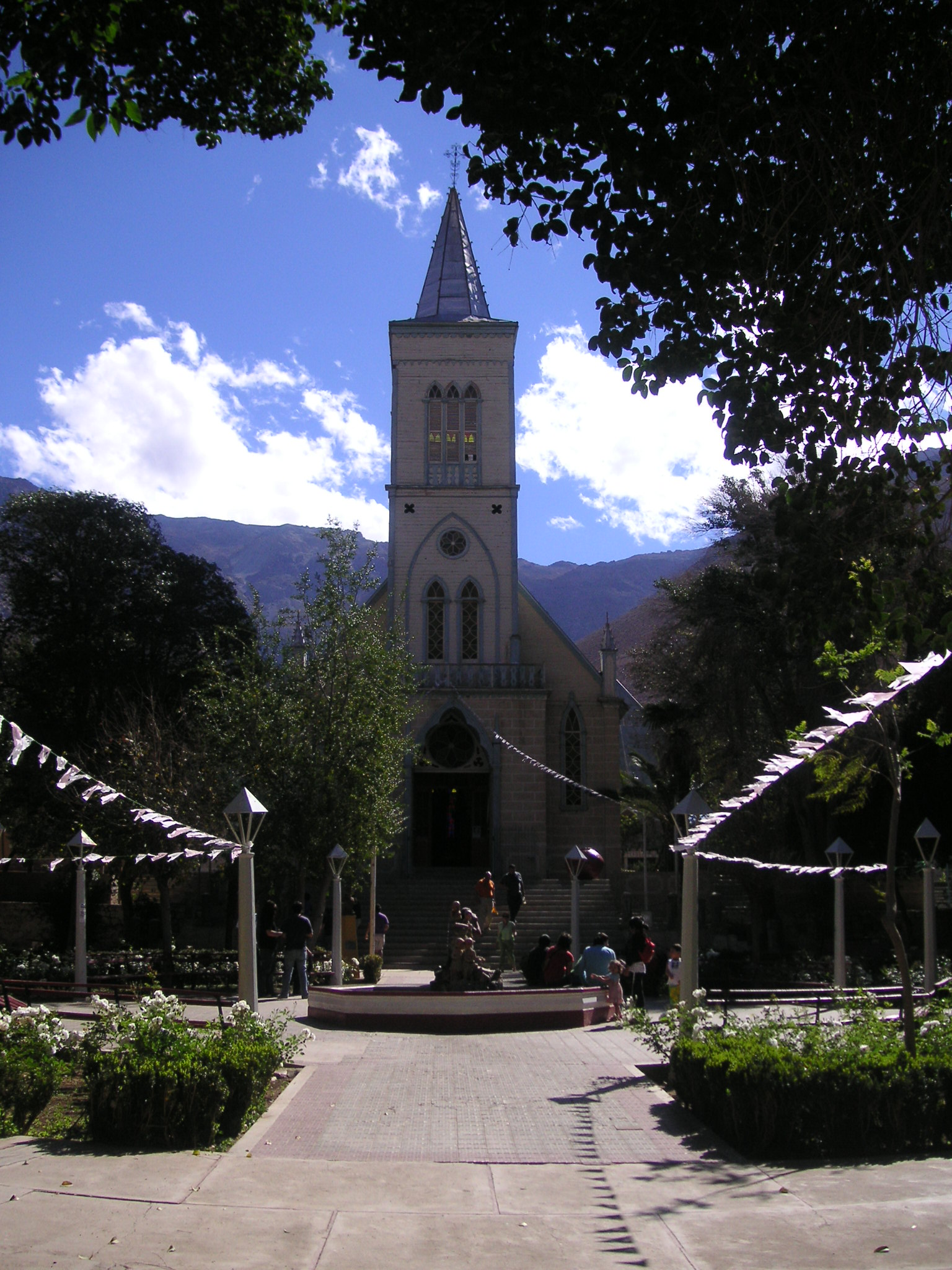
Pisco Elqui Church

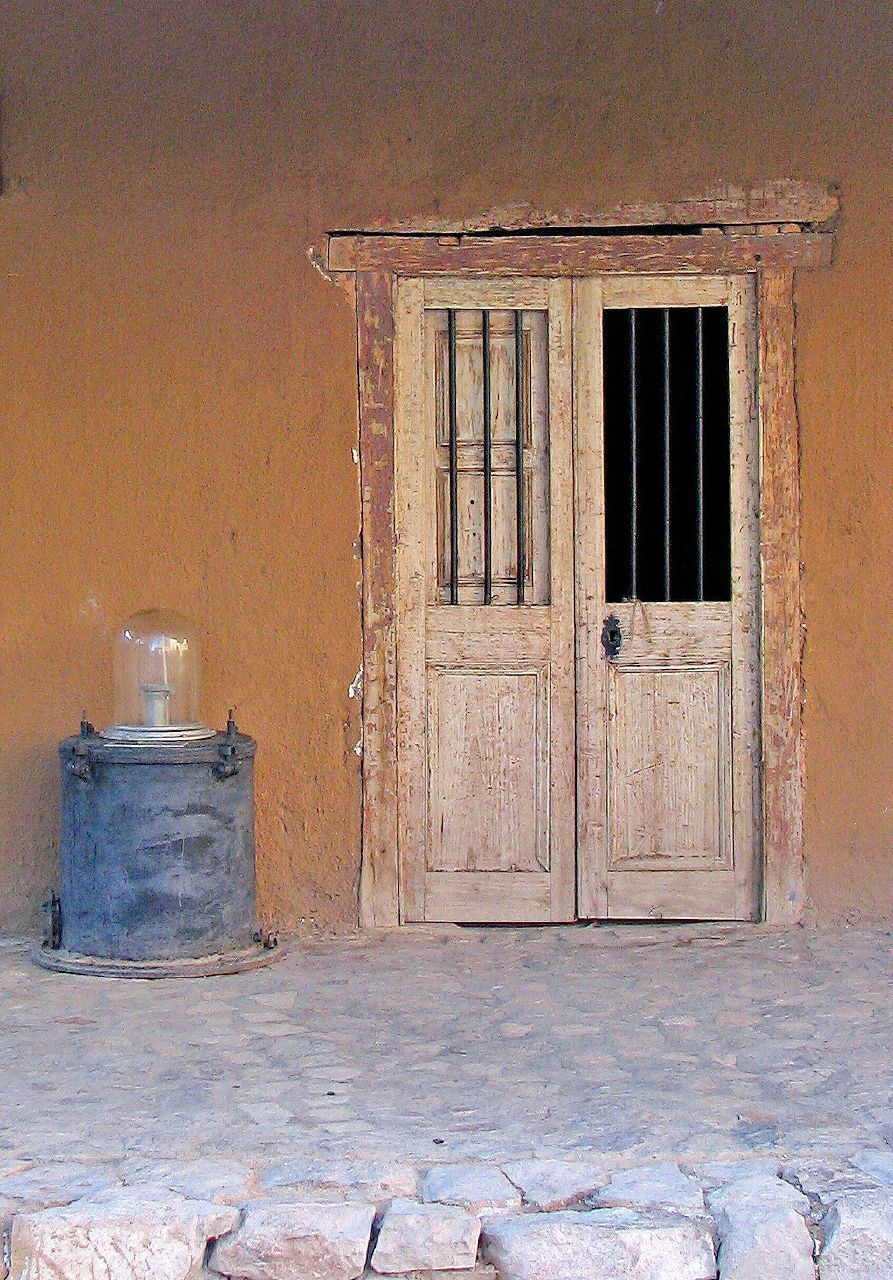
An old distillery in Pisco Elqui

Pisco Elqui is a Chilean village (pueblo) in the commune of Paihuano, Elqui Province, Coquimbo Region. It is located in the Elqui Valley, 107 km east from La Serena, at about 1,300 metres above sea level.

Prior to Spanish colonization, the Elqui Valley and the basin of the Claro River were inhabited by Indigenous peoples associated with the Molle and Diaguita cultures, later incorporated into the Inca sphere. During the colonial period, the area became part of large agricultural estates, and early pottery production and grape-based distillation developed in the valley.

The settlement was originally known as La Greda, reflecting local clay extraction. In 1873, following a smallpox epidemic, it was renamed La Unión by agreement among its residents, a change later formalized by decree. In 1936, under Law No. 5,798, the village was renamed Pisco Elqui. This renaming has been noted as controversial, as it was linked to Chile’s efforts to reinforce its position regarding the denomination of origin of pisco. After Chile’s administrative regionalization, the locality was incorporated into the commune of Paihuano.
