= Vicuña, Chile =

Vicuña
- City and Commune
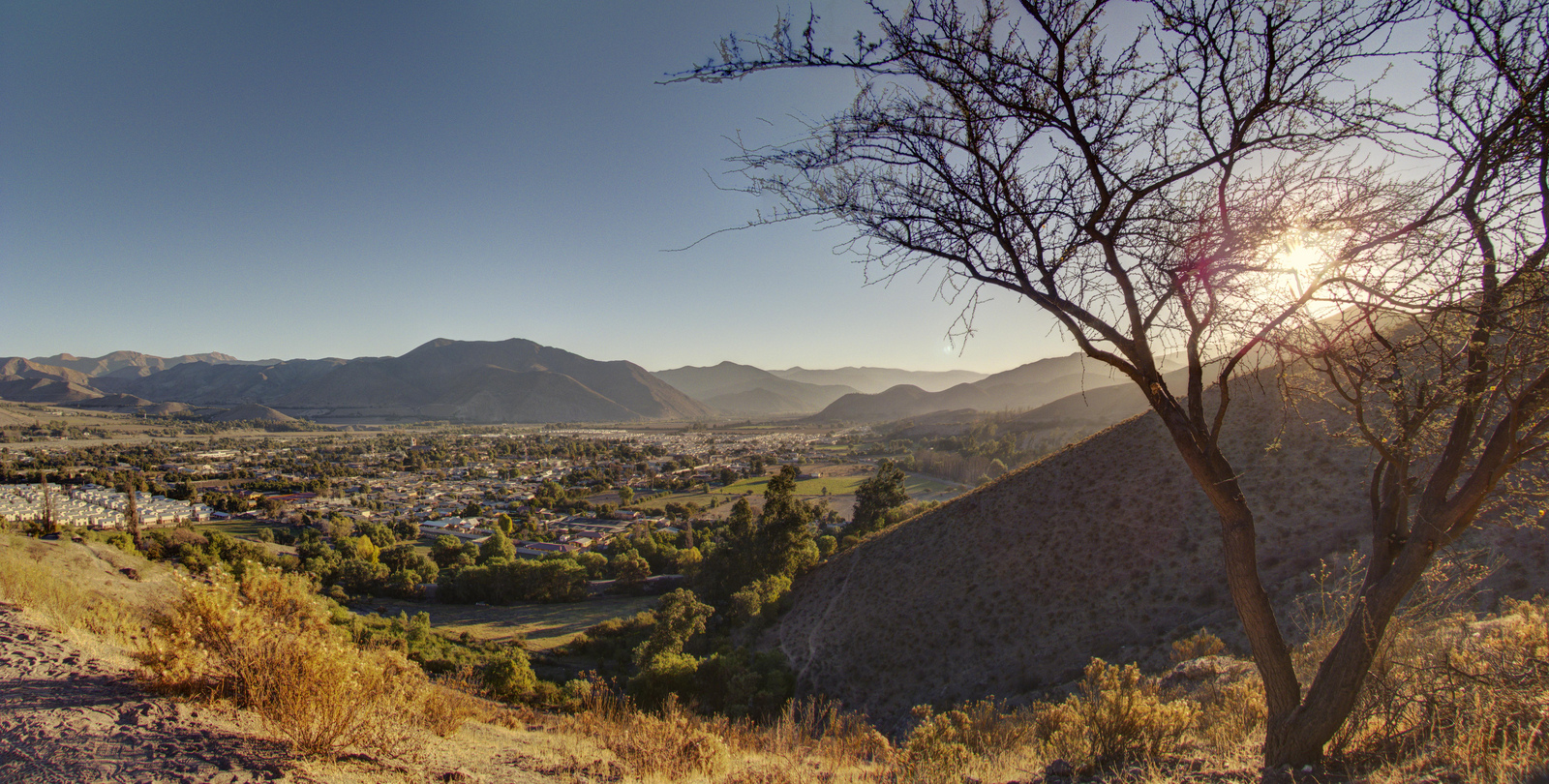
- Vicuña as seen from nearby hills.

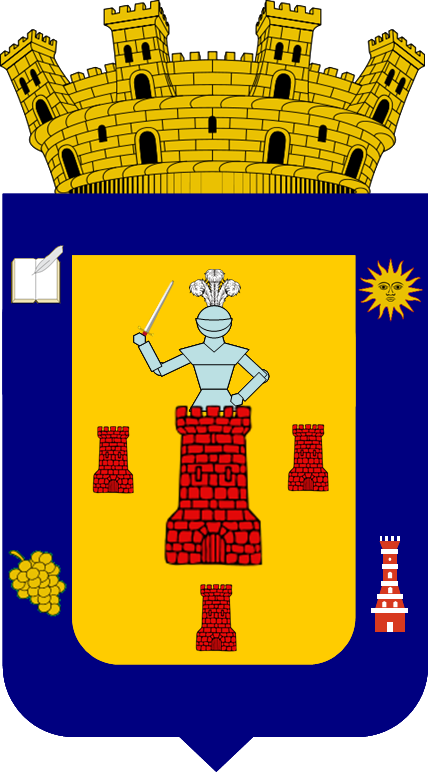
- Coat of arms Location in Coquimbo Region Location in Chile
- Coordinates (city): 30°02′S 70°43′W
- Country: Chile
- Region: Coquimbo
- Province: Elqui
- Founded: February 22, 1821

Government
  - Type: Municipality
  - Alcalde: Rafael Vera Castillo (Independent)

Area
  - City and Commune: 7,609.8 km^{2} (2,938.2 sq mi)
- Elevation: 709 m (2,326 ft)

Population (2024)
  - City and Commune: 28,047
  - Density: 3.6856/km^{2} (9.5458/sq mi)
  - Urban: 16,338
  - Rural: 11,709
- Demonym: Vicuñense
- Time zone: UTC−4 (CLT)
  - Summer (DST): UTC−3 (CLST)
- Area code: 56 + 51
- Website: Official website (in Spanish)

Vicuña (Spanish pronunciation: [biˈkuɲa]) is a city and commune in Elqui Province in the Coquimbo Region in Chile, founded during the government of Bernardo O'Higgins to secure sovereignty over the Elqui Valley. It has 28,047 inhabitants.

It shares borders to the west with the communes of La Higuera, La Serena and Andacollo, to the east with Argentina and to the south with Paihuano and Rio Hurtado. The commune is administered by the municipality of Vicuña, which is the principal city of the Valle de Elqui.

Poet Gabriela Mistral was born here in 1889.

== History ==
Vicuña was founded on February 22, 1821, by Colonel Joaquín Vicuña Larraín, who was the first intendant of Coquimbo Province, by order of Bernardo O'Higgins. He named it Villa de San Isidro de Vicuña. In 1872, its name was shortened to Vicuña, in honor of its founder.

== Geography ==
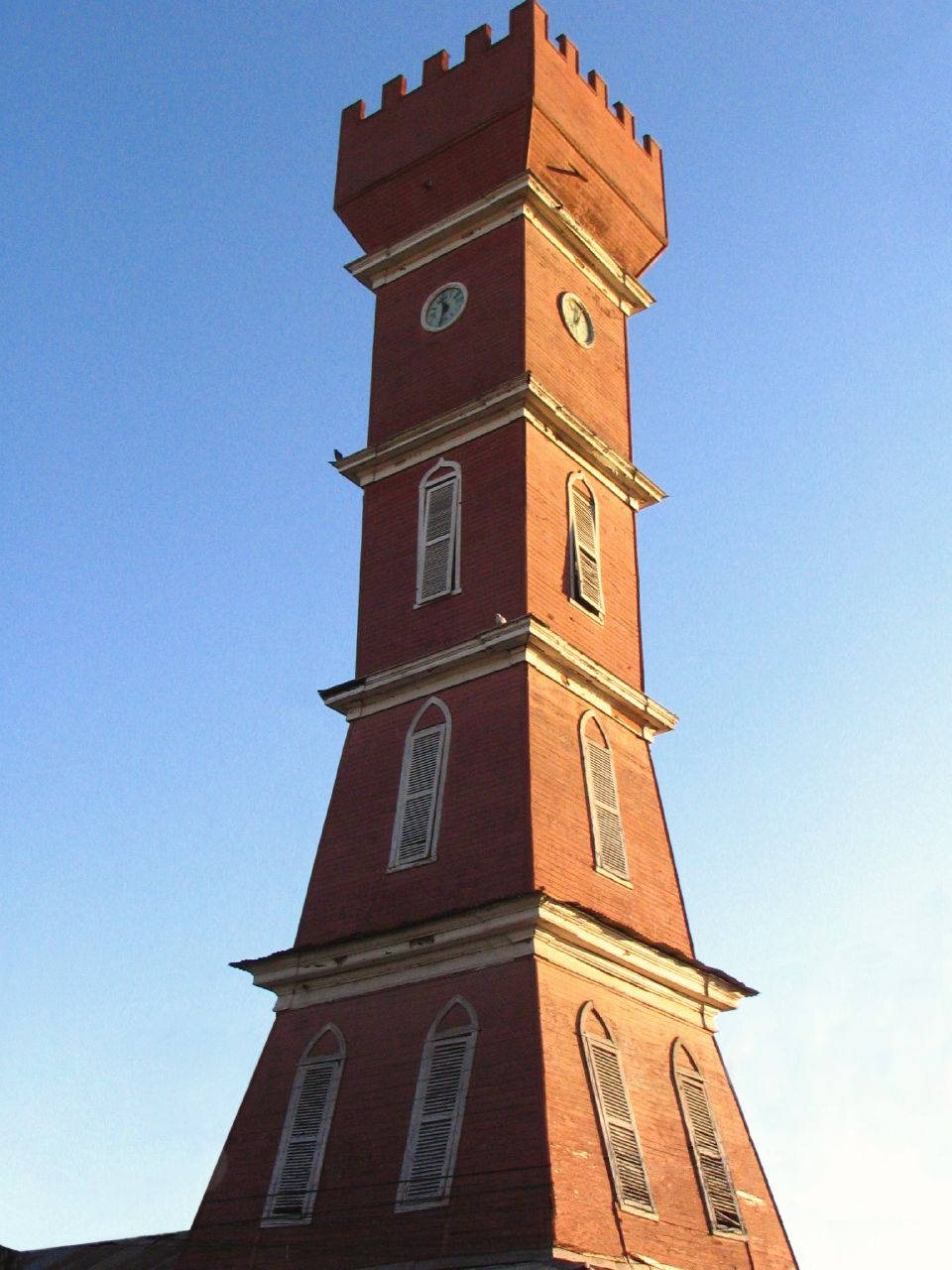
Bauer tower in the center of Vicuña.

The Vicuña commune covers an area of 7,609.8 km^{2} (2,938 sq mi), making it the largest commune in both the province and the Coquimbo Region, and the second-largest commune in the country. Vicuña occupies the major part of the mid and upper Elqui River basin, and the entire length of the Turbio river.

The area is dominated by a mountainous backdrop, and extensive plains on the valley floor, where high-quality grapes for pisco are grown, along with other fruits and vegetables. The La Punilla, Atimonate, Balalita, Los Tilos mountain ranges contain several peaks with altitudes over 4,000 m.

=== Climate ===
Climate data for Vicuña, elevation 620 m (2,030 ft)
Month	Jan	Feb	Mar	Apr	May	Jun	Jul	Aug	Sep	Oct	Nov	Dec	Year
Mean daily maximum °C (°F)	28.3 (82.9)	28.6 (83.5)	27.5 (81.5)	24.8 (76.6)	22.5 (72.5)	20.4 (68.7)	19.7 (67.5)	21.0 (69.8)	23.7 (74.7)	25.1 (77.2)	26.6 (79.9)	27.7 (81.9)	24.7 (76.4)
Daily mean °C (°F)	19.8 (67.6)	19.6 (67.3)	17.9 (64.2)	15.3 (59.5)	13.3 (55.9)	11.4 (52.5)	11.4 (52.5)	12.0 (53.6)	14.0 (57.2)	15.5 (59.9)	16.9 (62.4)	19.3 (66.7)	15.5 (59.9)
Mean daily minimum °C (°F)	12.0 (53.6)	11.5 (52.7)	10.2 (50.4)	8.2 (46.8)	6.8 (44.2)	5.8 (42.4)	5.8 (42.4)	5.4 (41.7)	6.9 (44.4)	8.0 (46.4)	8.6 (47.5)	10.3 (50.5)	8.3 (46.9)
Average precipitation mm (inches)	0.2 (0.01)	3.4 (0.13)	0.3 (0.01)	4.6 (0.18)	20.2 (0.80)	49.6 (1.95)	27.9 (1.10)	35.9 (1.41)	4.2 (0.17)	9.3 (0.37)	0.0 (0.0)	1.5 (0.06)	157.1 (6.19)
Average relative humidity (%)	61	62	65	66	63	61	61	61	60	60	57	58	61
Source: Bioclimatografia de Chile

== Demographics ==
Historical population
Year	Pop.	±% p.a.
1875	8,345	—
1885	11,449	+3.21%
1895	9,302	−2.06%
1907	9,492	+0.17%
1920	8,845	−0.54%
1930	9,008	+0.18%
1940	10,027	+1.08%
1952	10,549	+0.42%
1970	15,655	+2.22%
1982	19,502	+1.85%
1992	21,660	+1.06%
2002	23,992	+1.03%
2017	27,771	+0.98%
2024	28,047	+0.14%
Source: INE, Memoria Chilena

As of the 2024 census, the population is 28,047, of which 49.0% are males, and 51.0% are females. People under 15 years old make up 18.4% of the population, and people over 65 years old make up 15.6%. 58.3% of the population is urban and 41.7% is rural.

=== Ethnic minorities ===
As of the 2024 census, Indigenous peoples make up 13.6% of the population, and Afro-Chileans make up 0.7%.

=== Religion ===
As of the 2024 census, 78.5% of the population over 15 years old are Christians (71.6% Catholics, 4.0% Evangelicals or Protestants, and 2.9% other branches), 0.1% are Jews, 0.02% are Muslims, 0.1% are Buddhists, 0.1% are Hinduists, 0.3% are adrehents of other religions, and 20.9% are irreligious.

=== Immigration ===
As of the 2024 census, immigrants make up 4.4% of the population - 3.9% are from South America, 0.3% from North America, 0.1% from Europe, 0.03% from Asia, 0.01% from Africa, and 0.004% from Oceania.

== Administration ==
The commune is administered by the alcalde Rafael Vera Castillo (DC), who is advised by a municipal council of six members:

- Cristián Pinto Torres (RN)
- Irene Ramos Romo (UDI)
- Kether Gómez Pastén (Ind./PS)
- Rodrigo Alcayaga Rojas (PR)
- Miriam Rojas Cabello (DC)
- Caroll Alcayaga Callejas (Ind./PS)

Within the electoral divisions of Chile, Vicuña is represented in the Chamber of Deputies by deputies Marcelo Díaz (PS) and Mario Bertolino (RN) as a part of the 7th electoral district (together with La Serena, La Higuera, Paiguano and Andacollo). The commune is represented in the Senate by senators Evelyn Matthei (UDI) and Jorge Pizarro (PDC) as part of the 4th senatorial constituency (Coquimbo).

== Economy ==
Vicuña is a major center for pisco production. Cooperativa Agrícola Pisquera Elqui Limitada (CAPEL) runs the main pisco distillery in the zone. Economic activity centers on the culture of grapes, fruits, cereals, and vegetables. Other industries include sheep ranching and iron and copper mining. Tourism has grown greatly in the last few years, primarily due to quality hotels and restaurants. The area around Vicuña experiences approximately 300 totally clear days and nights annually, and several large astronomical observatories are located nearby, including the touristic Mammalluca Observatory. The urban area is made up of buildings from around 1900. The city has a square of ancient trees, which displays sculptures that honor Gabriela Mistral, who was awarded the Nobel Prize in Literature. Other points of interest include the Temple of the Immaculate Conception; the Bauer Tower, which houses the office of tourism; and the Gabriela Mistral museums.

=== Tourism ===
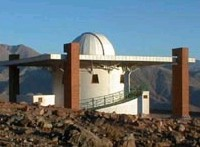
Mamalluca observatory.

A few kilometres outside town is the Route of the Grappa, visiting the factories known as pisqueras: Ruta Norte, Capel, Mistral, Tres Erres and Artesanos de Cochiguaz. The Mammalluca Observatory located 9 km north of Vicuña, has tourist and education programs. At the Cerro Tololo Inter-American Observatory, daily tourist visits are offered.

== See also ==
- Gabriela Mistral
- Julio Alberto Mercado Illanes
- FloyyMenor
