= Cristóbal Juliá =

Chilean politician (born 1980)

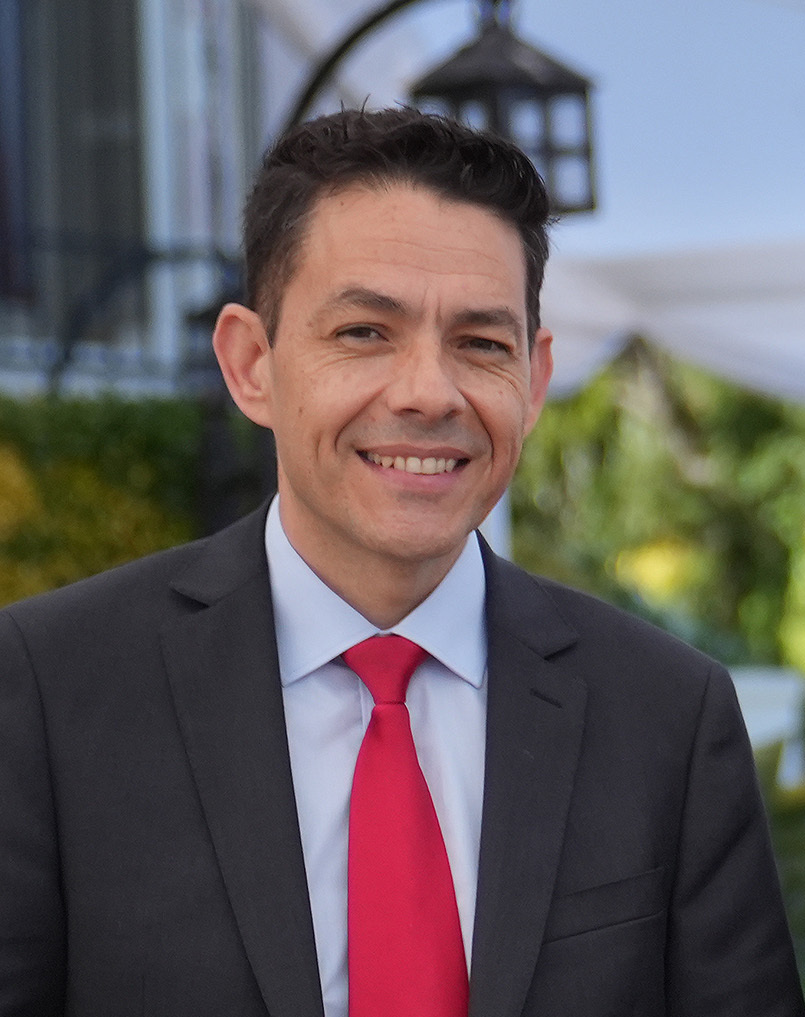

Governor of the Coquimbo Region
- Incumbent
- Assumed office 6 January 2025
- Preceded by: Darwin Ibacache

Personal details
- Born: Cristóbal Nicolás Juliá de la Vega; 14 May 1980 (age 46) Monte Patria, Chile
- Party: Independent (close to Evópoli)
- Spouse: Verónica Castro Pizarro
- Children: 2
- Education: University of Valparaíso
- Occupation: Meteorologist and politician

Cristóbal Nicolás Juliá de la Vega (born 14 May 1980) is a Chilean meteorologist and politician. Since 6 January 2025, he has served as Governor of the Coquimbo Region.

Prior to assuming office, he developed a professional career in public administration, scientific research, and meteorological communication, particularly in areas related to water resources, environmental management, and climate change.

== Early life and family ==
He was born in the commune of Monte Patria, in the Limarí Province, into a family linked to the agricultural sector. During his childhood, he moved to the city of Ovalle, where he completed his primary and secondary education at Amalia Errázuriz School.

In 1998, he enrolled at the University of Valparaíso, where he studied meteorology, graduating in 2007. This academic background marked the main axis of his subsequent professional development.

=== Marriage and children ===
He is married to Verónica Castro Pizarro and is the father of two children.

== Professional career ==
After completing his university studies, in 2007 he returned to the Coquimbo Region to join the Center for Advanced Studies in Arid Zones (CEAZA), where he worked for nine years as a researcher on issues related to environmental sustainability and water resource management.

During the second government of Sebastián Piñera, he served in various regional-level public institutions. At the Institute of Agricultural Development (INDAP), he worked as Emergency Coordinator and Project Engineer; he later held positions at the Regional Ministerial Secretariat of Mining and at the General Water Directorate (DGA), where he served as regional director. In these roles, he participated in activities related to agricultural emergency management, the promotion of sustainable mining development, and the administration of water resources.

In parallel, he briefly ventured into entrepreneurship as a co-founder of the pastry shop Café Nimbus.

Following his departure from the DGA at the beginning of the Gabriel Boric government, he began collaborating in 2022 with Mi Radio, a local radio station in the Coquimbo Region, where he worked as a meteorological analyst and broadcaster, providing climate and environmental information to the regional audience.

== Political career ==
In 2017, he began his political involvement by linking himself to the Political Evolution (Evópoli) party, without formally becoming a member. That same year, he ran as a candidate for the Regional Council representing the Elqui Province, but was not elected.

In 2024, he ran for the position of Regional Governor of Coquimbo as an independent candidate, participating in the Chile Vamos primaries. In that instance, he obtained the highest number of votes, becoming the coalition's official candidate for the regional elections.

In the first round of the regional elections, he did not obtain the required percentage to be elected, and therefore faced a runoff election against Javier Vega, the candidate of the Communist Party of Chile (PC). In this round, he obtained 63% of the vote and was elected regional governor.

He assumed office on 6 January 2025, becoming the second regional governor of the Coquimbo Region.

=== Controversies ===
During his political career, he has publicly expressed support for the Dominga Mining-Port Project, arguing its impact on job creation and regional economic development. This position has generated criticism from environmental organizations due to the potential effects of the project on the marine ecosystem and the Humboldt Penguin National Reserve.

== Electoral history ==
Year	Election	Constituency	Coalition	Party	Votes	%	Result
2017	Regional councillor election	Elqui Province	Chile Vamos	Ind. / Evópoli	4,569	3.2	Not elected
2024	Gubernatorial primaries	Coquimbo Region	Chile Vamos	Ind. / Evópoli	8,678	42.92	Nominated
2024	Regional election (first round)	Coquimbo Region	Chile Vamos	Ind. / Evópoli	97,208	21.77	Runoff
2024	Regional election (second round)	Coquimbo Region	Chile Vamos	Ind. / Evópoli	308,567	63.00	Elected
