= Elqui Valley =

Elqui Valley may refer to:

- Elqui River, a river in northern Chile
- Elqui Valley (wine region), a wine region centered on Elqui River
