= Apyrauna maculicorne =

Scientific classification
- Kingdom: Animalia
- Phylum: Arthropoda
- Class: Insecta
- Order: Coleoptera
- Suborder: Polyphaga
- Infraorder: Cucujiformia
- Family: Cerambycidae
- Genus: Apyrauna
- Species: A. maculicorne

Binomial name
- Apyrauna maculicorne (Germain, 1898)

Synonyms
- Grammicosum maculicorne Germain,1898; Grammicosum larsoni Cerda, 1981

Species of beetle

Apyrauna maculicorne is a species of longhorn beetle in the tribe Elaphidiini. It was described by Germain in 1898. It is found in Elqui and Maipo Provinces of Chile.
