= Puclaro Dam =

Dam in Chile

Puclaro
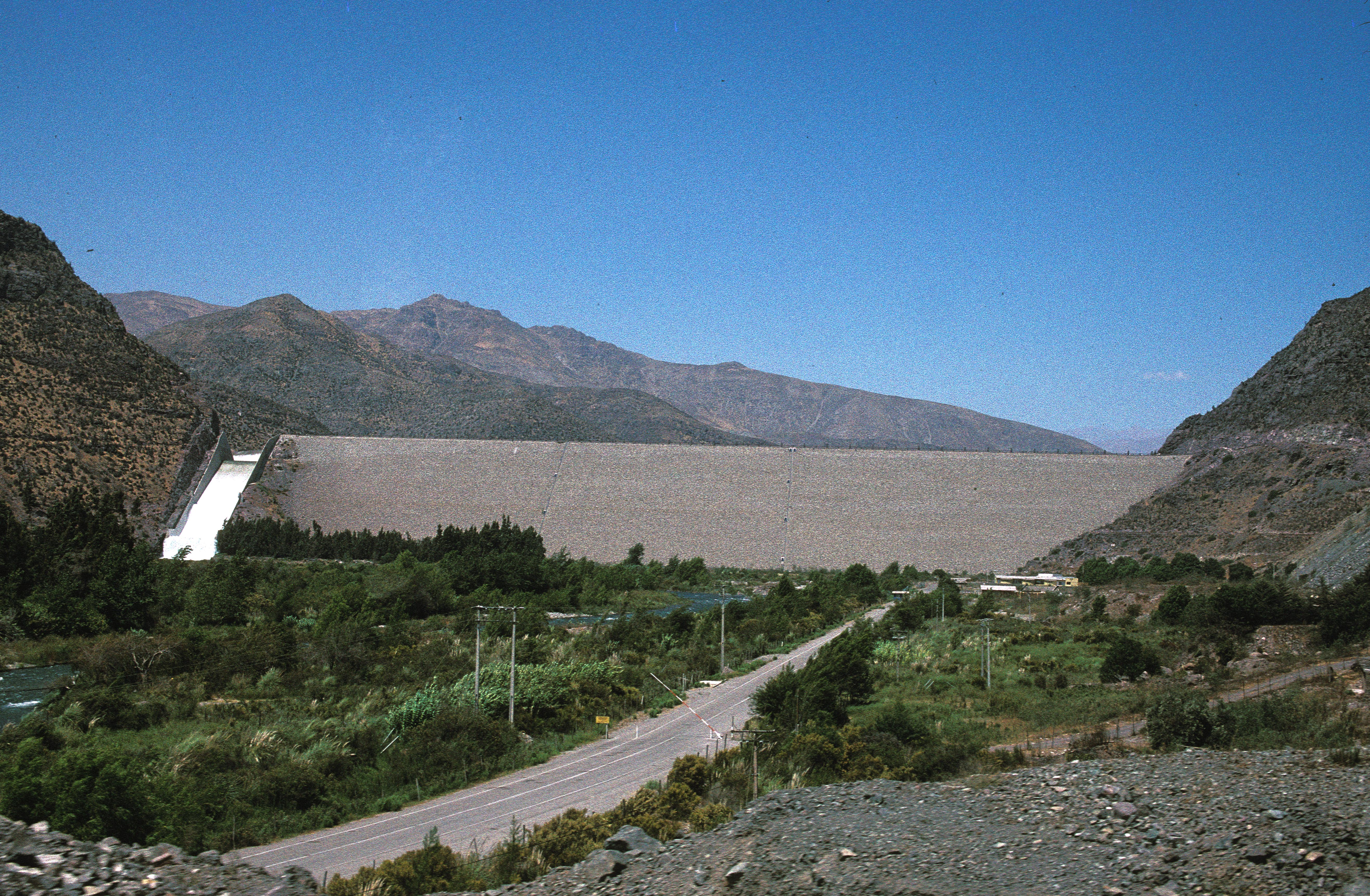
- The dam which forms the lake is visible in the background

- Location within Coquimbo Region
- Coordinates: 30.01°S 70.82°W
- Type: reservoir
- Primary inflows: Elqui River
- Primary outflows: Elqui River
- Basin countries: Chile
- Max. length: 5.95 km (3.70 mi)
- Surface area: 760 ha (1,900 acres)
- Max. depth: 83 m (272 ft)
- Water volume: 4.63×10^{6} m^{3} (3,750 acre⋅ft)
- Surface elevation: 435 m (1,427 ft)
- Dam: Puclaro Dam

Puclaro is an artificial lake created by a dam on the Elqui River, 40 km east of the city of La Serena, Coquimbo Region and 500 km north of Santiago, Chile. Regular strong winds make the lake a popular place for kitesurfing.

Its purpose is to improve the irrigation of 21,000 ha of farmland in the Elqui valley.

== Dam ==
Puclaro Dam is an 83 m tall and 640 m long concrete face gravel fill dam with a crest altitude of 435 m. The volume of the dam is 4,630,000 m³. The dam features a spillway over the dam (maximum discharge 3,800 m³/s). The upstream concrete face varies in thickness from 0.45 m to 0.30 m.

Puclaro dam is founded on very pervious alluvial foundations more than 100 m deep.
