= Julio Mercado Illanes =

Chilean politician (1920–1994)

Julio Alberto Mercado Illanes
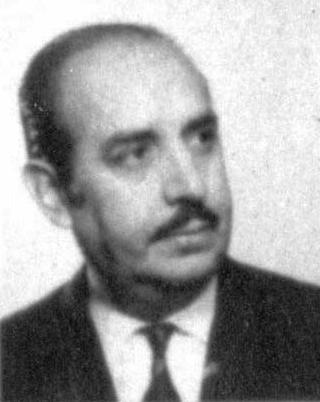
- Illanes during his 1969-1973 parliamentary term

Member of Parliament, Republic of Chile
- In office October 8, 1958 – May 15, 1965
- Preceded by: Hugo Zepeda Barrios
- Succeeded by: Arturo Valdés Phillips
- Constituency: La Serena, Coquimbo, Elqui, Ovalle, Combarbalá and Illapel

Member of Parliament, Republic of Chile
- In office May 15, 1969 – September 21, 1973
- Preceded by: Arturo Valdés Phillips
- Constituency: La Serena, Coquimbo, Elqui, Ovalle, Combarbalá and Illapel

Personal details
- Born: January 14, 1920 Vicuña, Chile
- Died: April 23, 1994 (aged 74) Santiago, Chile
- Resting place: Vicuña, Chile
- Party: Radical Party of Chile
- Spouse: Laura Estela Bolados Rojas
- Occupation: Accountant

Julio Alberto Mercado Illanes (1920–1994) was a Chilean accountant, businessman and politician. He was born in Vicuña on January 14, 1920, and died in Santiago on April 23, 1994. His remains are interred in Vicuña. He was the son of Juvenal Mercado and Zunilda Illanes Olivares.

== Education ==
Mercado pursued his elementary and secondary education at the Men of La Serena Lyceum. Later, he joined the Coquimbo Trade Institute, where he graduated as a General Accountant in 1939, being awarded the best student by the Chamber of Commerce. After completing his qualifications he worked at Gibs Williamson Ltd. Later, from 1946 to 1959, he established offices and warehouses for the trading of fruit on behalf of the South American Fruit Company.

== Political activity ==
From childhood Mercado had an inclination towards radical politics. At the age of twelve he joined the youth arm of the Radical Party, later becoming President of the Youth Assembly of La Serena. Later he joined the adult Radical Party, remaining with the party until 1969. Within the party he occupied positions such as: Secretary and President of the Radical Assembly, Delegate to the Provincial Board of the Coquimbo Radical Party, Provincial President of the Youth and Adult Assembly of Coquimbo, Spokesperson for the Provincial Board of Coquimbo and Delegate to the Radical Party's National Convention in Valdivia, Concepción, La Serena and Santiago (1941–1969), where the radical presidential candidates were chosen. He was Departmental Governor of Limarí from 1942 to 1946 and Alderman for the City of Coquimbo from 1946 to 1955. He was also the provincial leader of Private Sector Employees in the province of Coquimbo.

== Parliamentary career ==
Mercado reached the House of Representatives on October 8, 1958, after being elected in a supplementary vote to replace Hugo Zepeda Barrios, who had been elected Senator. In this supplementary election, Mercado got 16,712 votes against 13,635 for Roberto Flores Alvarez, of the Popular Socialist Party. Mercado joined the Foreign Relations, Mining and Industry, Interior Police and Regulations, Agriculture and Colonization and Special Housing Committees.

In 1961 he was elected Member of Parliament by the departmental grouping of La Serena, Coquimbo, Elqui, Ovalle, Combarbalá and Illapel, a position which he was occupying since 1958. This time he was rightly elected into the office for the period 1961–1965. This time he joined the Interior Police and Regulations, Finance, Joint Budget, Dollar Special (1962) and Earthquake Special (1965) Committees. He also participated in the Special Commissions of Inquiry into the strike movement of Secondary Students (1961) and of the Copper Industry (1961). During this period he was a member of the Radical Parliamentary Committee and traveled to Tacna and Arica to the Chile-Peru Interparliamentary meeting held in 1965. That same year, he ran for Senator for the 2nd Provincial Association "Atacama and Coquimbo," but was not elected.

In 1969 he founded the Radical Democratic Party along with former senators Julio Duran Neumann and Angel Faivovich Hitzcovich and former Parliamentary representatives Raul Morales Adriasola, Hector Campos Perez and Rafael Señoret Lapsley, among others.

He was elected Parliamentary representative for the departmental group of La Serena, Coquimbo, Elqui, Ovalle, Combarbalá and Illapel, for the period 1969–1973. During his term, he was a member of the Independent Parliamentary Committee (1970–1971) and President of the House of Representatives (1969–1970).

Between 1971 and 1972 he participated in the Inter-Parliamentary meeting that took place in the Netherlands, Germany, France, Italy and other European countries. In 1973 he was elected Member of Parliament by the same group departmental for the period 1973–1977. He was part of the Standing Committee on Public Education, Housing, and Mining and Industry. However, his term came to an end following the military coup of September 11, 1973, that by means of Decree Law 27 of September 21 of that year, Congress closed and the functions of the legislature ceased.

== Exile ==
Mercado was not an active political opponent of the military regime, so he was not pursued. Even Radical Democracy was on the side of authoritarian rule until 1975. During this period he was president of the Association of Retired National Congressionals, which brought together former staff and former parliamentarians and presidents of the "Hall of Former Radical Parliamentarians", a body of former senators and former Parliamentary representatives of the party, who advised the government of General Augusto Pinochet on certain issues. The famous radical, Gabriel Gonzalez Videla was also a member of this group.

Mercado belonged to and directed several trade union, social, cultural and sporting institutions especially the Rotary Club of Coquimbo, serving for years as its president.

He went into hiding in 1975, when members of Radical Democracy turned against the dictatorship demanding the return to democracy. Upon the re-formation of the Radical Party of Chile in 1988, he joined its ranks, where he worked until the day of his death on April 23, 1994. His ashes rest in the Elqui Valley, a place where he always wanted to return.
