= Apyrauna annulicornis =

Scientific classification
- Domain: Eukaryota
- Kingdom: Animalia
- Phylum: Arthropoda
- Class: Insecta
- Order: Coleoptera
- Suborder: Polyphaga
- Infraorder: Cucujiformia
- Family: Cerambycidae
- Genus: Apyrauna
- Species: A. annulicornis

Binomial name
- Apyrauna annulicornis Martins, 2005

Species of beetle

Apyrauna annulicornis is a species of longhorn beetle in the tribe Elaphidiini. It was described by Martins in 2005. It is endemic to Isla de Cauropot, Brazil.
