= La Higuera, Chile =

La Higuera
- City and Commune
- Coat of arms Location in Chile
- Coordinates: 29°30′S 71°16′W
- Country: Chile
- Region: Coquimbo
- Province: Elqui
- Capital: La Higuera

Government
  - Type: Municipality
  - Alcalde: Sylvia Clavería Mondaca

Area
  - Total: 4,158.2 km^{2} (1,605.5 sq mi)
- Elevation: 594 m (1,949 ft)

Population (2012 Census)
  - Total: 4,285
  - Density: 1.030/km^{2} (2.669/sq mi)
  - Urban: 1,080
  - Rural: 2,641

Sex
  - Men: 2,084
  - Women: 1,637
- Time zone: UTC-4 (CLT)
  - Summer (DST): UTC-3 (CLST)
- Area code: 56 + 51
- Website: Municipality of La Higuera

La Higuera is a town and commune in Elqui Province, Coquimbo Region, Chile. It is bordered on the west by the Pacific Ocean, the east by the Atacama Region, and the south by the communes of Vicuña and La Serena.

Punta de Choros is famous for its beaches and a colony of bottlenose dolphins, the southernmost colony of that species. Of the total commune population, 1,080 live in urban zones and 2,641 live in rural zones.

The islands of Choros and Damas are also part of the commune, which form the National Reserve of the Humboldt Penguin, administered by the Corporación Nacional Forestal. On the island of Damas, the beach La Tijera is found at the extreme south.

Las Campanas Observatory and La Silla Observatory are also found in the territory of the commune.

== History ==
The territory of La Higuera was well known historically for its mineral resources, and was greatly developed between 1855 and 1880. This encouraged immigration to the area, though when it got exhausted, many of them left. Today the slag piles visible in the northern part of the town of La Higuera are a reminder of this bygone era.

There exist projects to install in the commune territory a modern thermal power station, with the idea of providing energy to the power grid that may be more reliable than hydroelectric power in times of drought. Despite the economic stimulus this would provide the commune, there are sectors of the population that oppose such an initiative due to the eventual environmental damage that it would cause.

Another problem that has affected the commune is the scarcity of potable water, due to various factors, which has led to public complaints to the municipal as well as regional government. A fog collection project installed on El Tofo mountain in the 1990s to supply the village of Chugungo had fallen into disrepair as of 2002, and water was delivered to the village by truck, despite requests for construction of a water pipeline.

== Demographics ==
According to the 2002 census of the National Statistics Institute, La Higuera had 3,721 inhabitants (2,084 men and 1,637 women). Of these, 1,080 (29%) lived in urban areas and 2,641 (71%) in rural areas. The population grew by 6.4% (223 persons) between the 1992 and 2002 censuses.

The population of the commune is dispersed between a number of villages located throughout the commune. The predominant ones are Caleta Los Hornos, Chungungo, La Higuera (communal capital), El Trapiche, Punta Colorada, Los Choros and Punta de Choros.

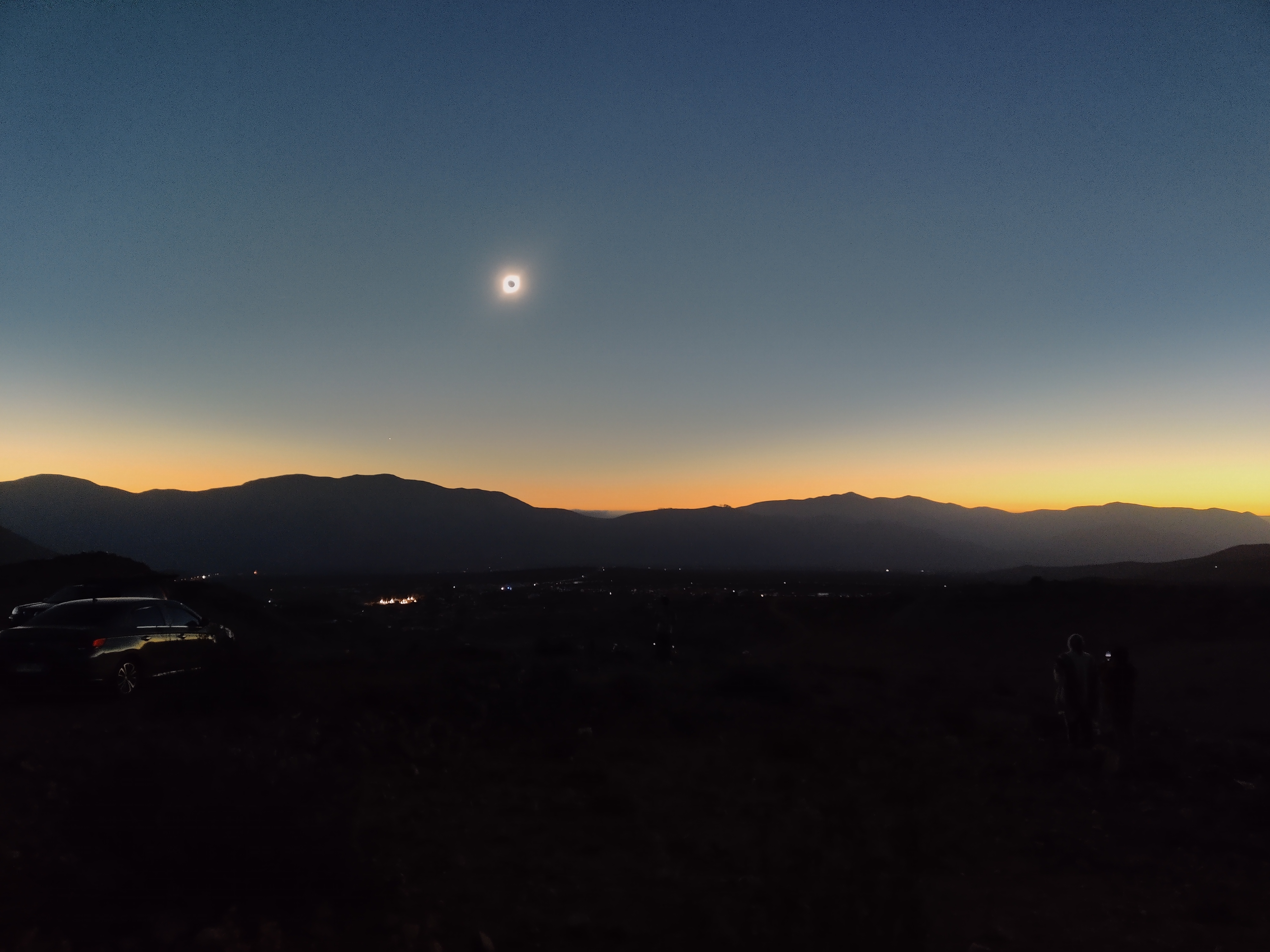
Town from hills above.

On July 2, 2019, the town was in the path of the 2019 Total Solar Eclipse, see photo.

== Administration ==
As a commune, La Higuera is a third-level administrative division of Chile administered by a municipal council, headed by an alcalde who is directly elected every four years. The 2008-2012 alcalde is Sylvia Clavería Mondaca.

Within the electoral divisions of Chile, La Higuera is represented in the Chamber of Deputies by Mr. Mario Bertolino (RN) and Marcelo Díaz (PS) as part of the 7th electoral district, (together with La Serena Vicuña, Paiguano and Andacollo).
