= El Día (Chile) =

- Type: Daily newspaper
- Format: Broadsheet
- Owner(s): Antonio Puga y Cía Ltda.
- Editor: Eleazar Garviso Galvez
- Founded: April 1, 1944
- Headquarters: Calle Brasil 431; La Serena, Chile
- Website: www.diarioeldia.cl

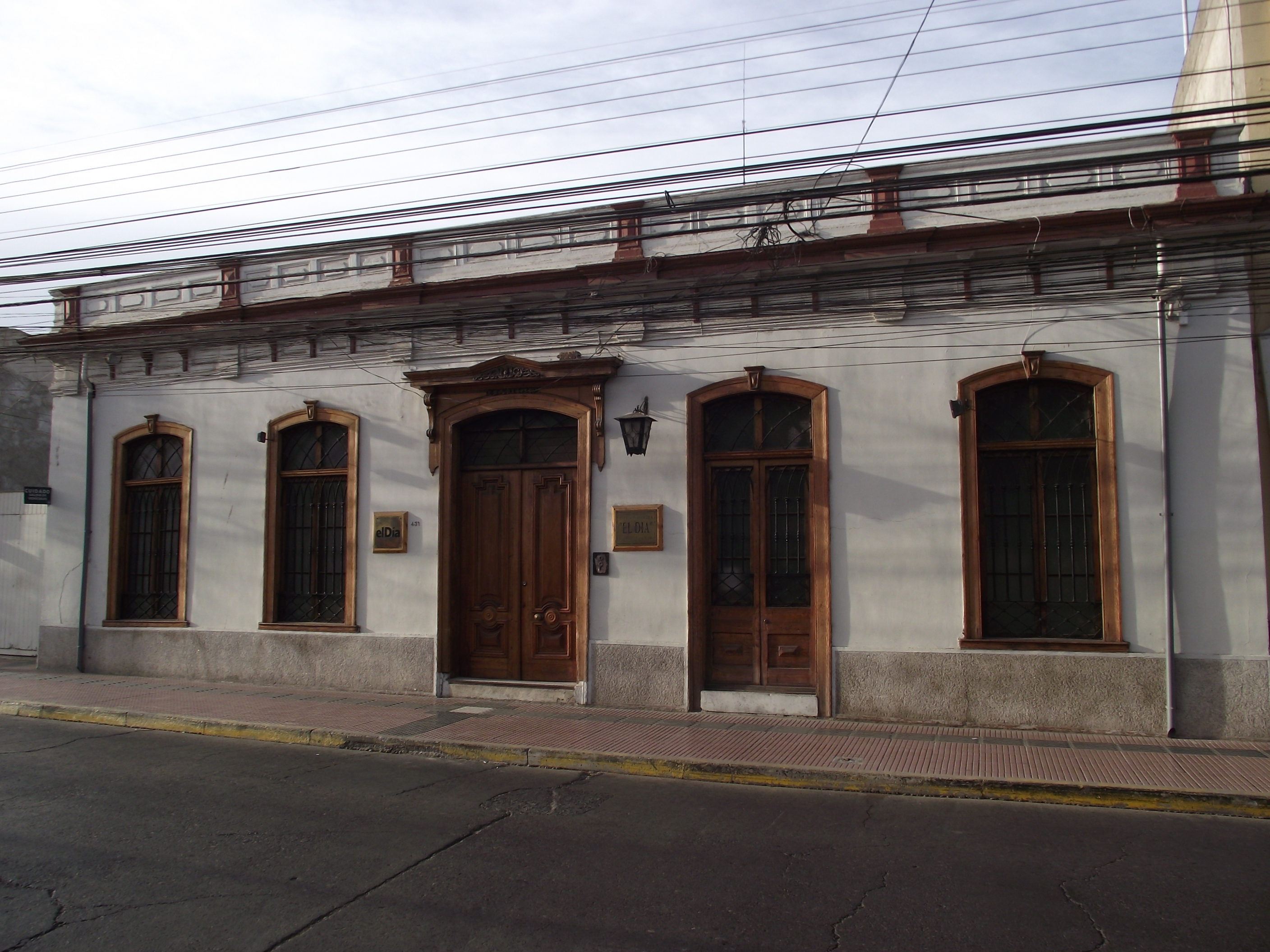
A building in El Dia

El Día is a Chilean newspaper based in La Serena serving the Coquimbo Region.

== History ==
El Día was founded by Pedro Vega Gutiérrez on April 1, 1944, with 1,200 copies of the first edition sold from a building at the corner of Calle Los Carrera and Calle Brasil in the center of La Serena. Antonio Puga Rodríguez acquired the newspaper in 1959, and his family continues to own it through the company Antonio Puga y Cía Ltda. As of 2015, El Día had an estimated 55,000 daily readers.
