= Andacollo =

- City and Commune
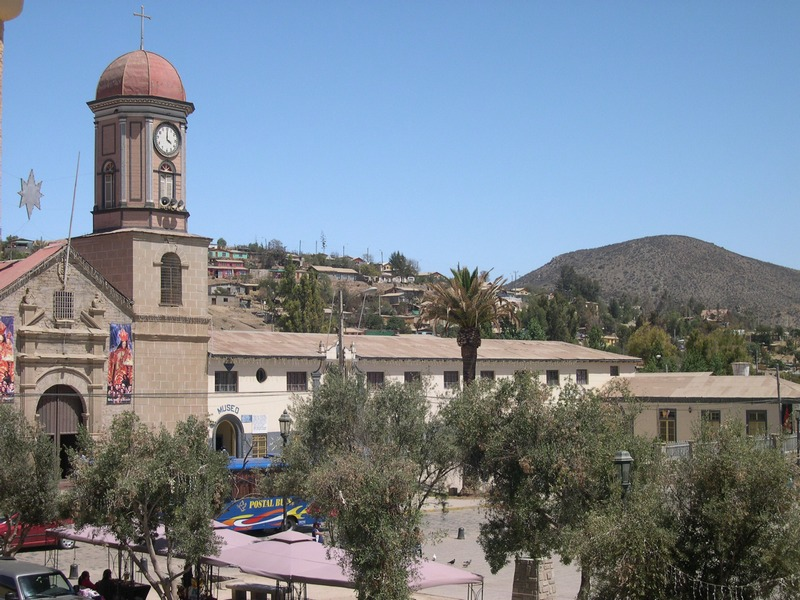
- Andacollo Plaza

- Coat of arms Location in Chile
- Coordinates: 30°13′49″S 71°5′9″W
- Country: Chile
- Region: Coquimbo
- Province: Elqui

Government
  - Type: Municipality

Area
  - Total: 310.3 km^{2} (119.8 sq mi)
- Elevation: 1,019 m (3,343 ft)

Population (2012 Census)
  - Total: 11,093
  - Density: 35.75/km^{2} (92.59/sq mi)
  - Urban: 9,444
  - Rural: 844

Sex
  - Men: 5,148
  - Women: 5,140
- Time zone: UTC−4 (CLT)
  - Summer (DST): UTC−3 (CLST)
- Area code: country 56 + city 51
- Website: Municipality of Andacollo

Andacollo (Spanish pronunciation: [an.da.ˈko.ʝo], from quechua anta, copper, gold; coya, queen) is a city and commune in the Elqui Province, Coquimbo Region, Chile. It is one of Chile's oldest and best known pilgrimage centers with Our Lady of Andacollo attracting thousands of devotees and tourists each year.

Economically, Andacollo is the central town of a mining district dominated by medium-scale mining. There are gold placers and gold mineralizations within felsic volcanic rock in its vicinity. The large open-pit copper mine Carmen de Andacollo lies next to the town and most of its workers live in the town.

Andacollo has the first project in Chile of reforestation aided by the creation of technosols. The project has been carried out on top of old mine tailings in the vicinity of the town.

== History ==
There are indications that the Inca Empire transferred a population of Churumatas from Tarija in present-day Bolivia to the area of Andacollo as attested by existence of a gold mine named Churumata in Spanish colonial times. Similarly, it has been proposed that a population of Tomatas were transferred the other way round from the vicinities of Elqui Valley to Bolivia.

Andacollo is a copper and gold mining city located in the semi-arid mountains of the Norte Chico. It was founded in 1891.

The town was subject to gold rush in the early 1930s when there was a large inflow of gold miners exploiting local placer deposits. While gold mining declined in the late 1930s, around 1935 Andacollo produced as much as 43% of all placer gold of Chile causing a shortage of water needed for processing.

Several legends are told about the name of the city. Some say that it comes from the Quechua Anta-Goya which means cobre-reina (copper queen). Others say that the name means "Hurry up, Collo" (Anda, Collo). According to these legends, La Virgen del Rosario, also known as la Virgen Morena, or Black Madonna, appeared to an indigenous miner called "Collo" in the form of a small wooden statuette hidden in rocks. The statue told the newly converted Collo to build up a church at the place where Andacollo is located today. As many miracles are attributed to the Dark Lady (like stopping the smallpox epidemic of 1871) the city celebrates the Virgin every year on December 24 to 26.

In 1971 state-owned ENAMI began studies to establish the Carmen de Andacollo copper mine where previously disorganized small-scale mining had occurred. The mine entered production in 1994.

== Demographics ==
According to the 2002 census of the National Statistics Institute, Andacollo had 10,288 inhabitants (5,148 men and 5,140 women). Of these, 9,444 (91.8%) lived in urban areas and 844 (8.2%) in rural areas. The population fell by 16% (1,958 persons) between the 1992 and 2002 censuses.

== Administration ==
As a commune, Andacollo is a third-level administrative division of Chile administered by a municipal council, headed by an alcalde who is directly elected every four years.

Within the electoral divisions of Chile, Andacollo is represented in the Chamber of Deputies by Mr. Mario Bertolino (RN) and Marcelo Díaz (PS) as part of the 7th electoral district, (together with La Serena, La Higuera, Vicuña and Paiguano). The commune is represented in the Senate by Evelyn Matthei Fornet (UDI) and Jorge Pizarro Soto (PDC) as part of the 4th senatorial constituency (Coquimbo Region).

== Gallery ==
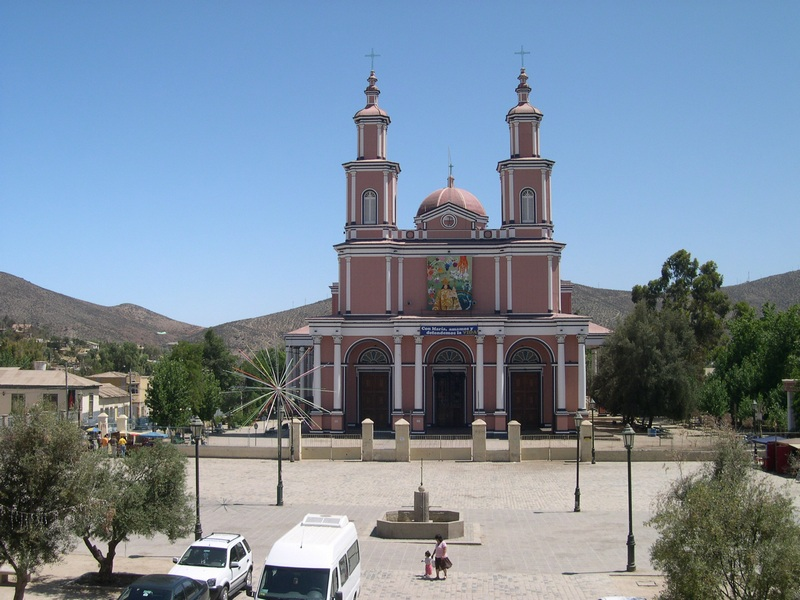
Basilica of Andacollo

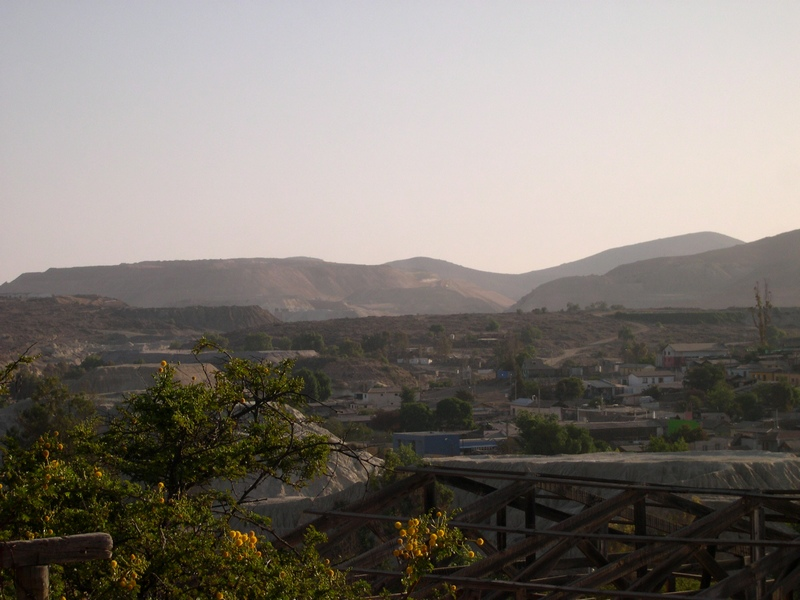
City view

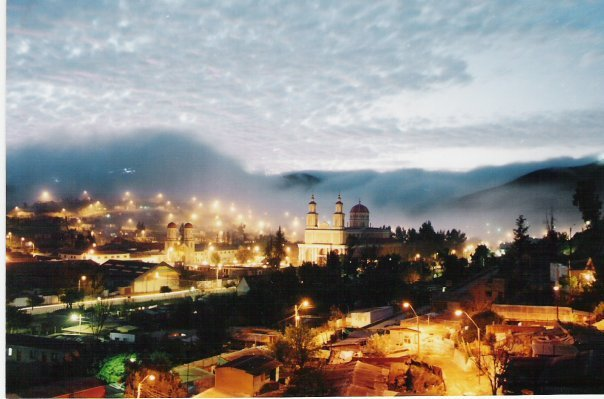
City view

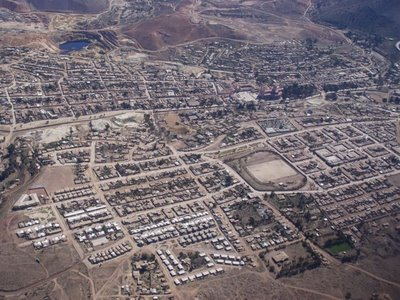
Aerial view of the city

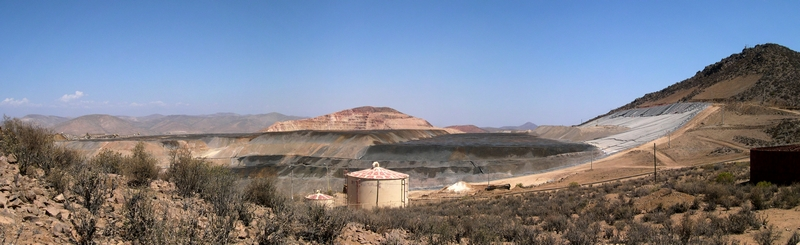
Industrial gold mine

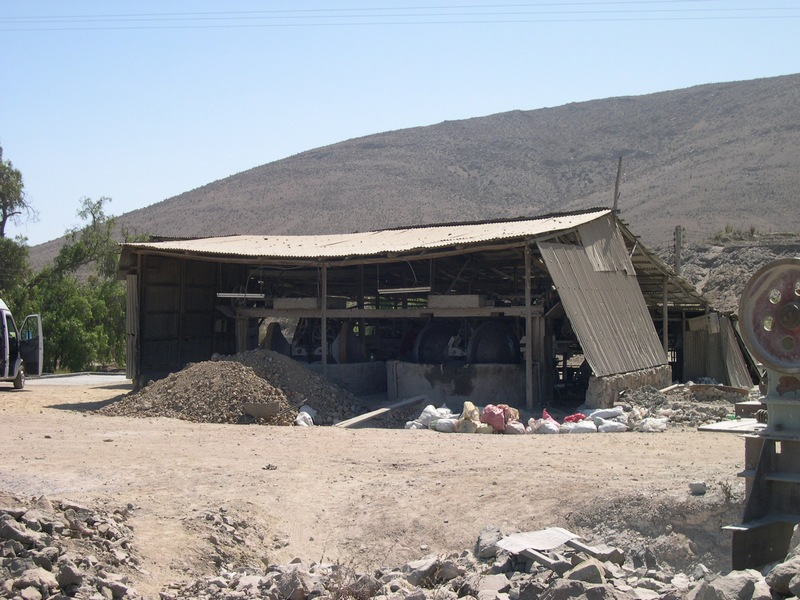
Traditional gold processing

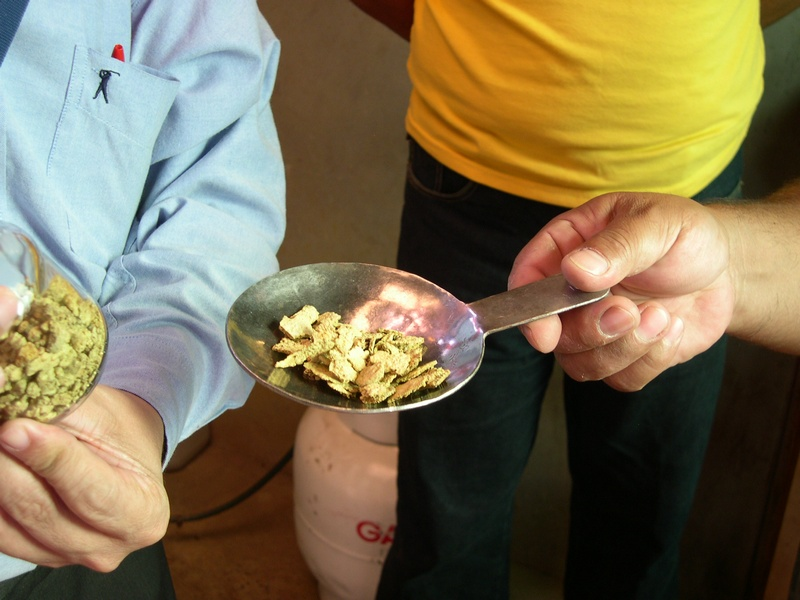
Mercury evaporation to produce gold
