= Cooperativa Capel =

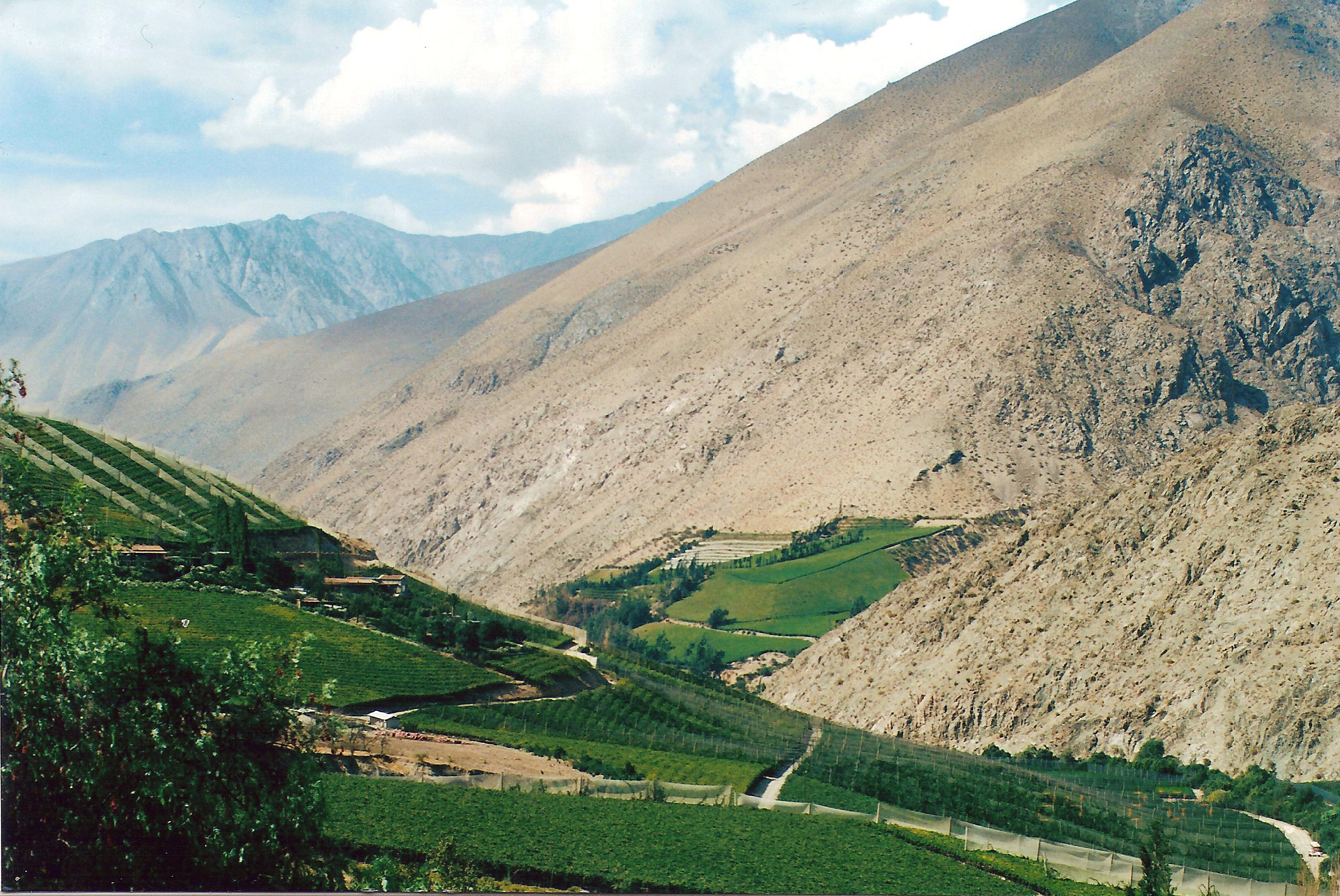
Vineyards in Elqui Valley

Cooperativa Agrícola Pisquera Elqui Limitada (CAPEL), also called Pisco Capel, is one of Chile's biggest spirits company and producer of pisco. Most of its croplands are in the Elqui Valley where the company was founded as a producers cooperative. It is one of the largest producers of Pisco in Chile (the other is the Sociedad Cooperativa Control Pisquero de Elqui y Vitivinículo de Norte Ltda (also called "Pisco Control")). Together Pisco Capel and Pisco control produce 90% of Chilean piscos.

Consultancy firm AC Nielsen reports that Capel's market participation in the pisco market – including pisco sour, cocktails and pisco coladas - over the period of February and March was 54.5 percent. Salina explained that the company's growth factors have been the cocktails, representing nearly 35 percent of its sales, and "it can keep growing because it is a product line which permits many innovations." At the end of 2008, Capel's profits were US$8.8 million, 78 percent greater than in 2007. About 68 percent of this figure corresponds to Capel's sales, while the rest are attributed to the Francisco de Aguirre vineyard's sales.

== History ==
Capel was founded after Chile was devastated by the Great Depression. It began in 1938 as a way for farmers to join forces in the face of rapidly plunging exports. Initially the cooperative was just 15 individual grape growers from the Elqui Valley. Today it has expanded to over 1,200 members and associates in numerous grape-growing regions throughout Chile. It is considered one of the few successful cooperatives in Chile today.

== Products ==
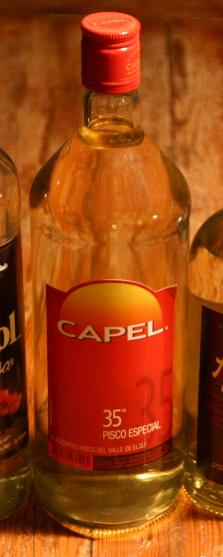
CAPEL, the main brand of pisco of the company CAPEL.

The company does not only produces pisco under the Capel brand but has also other brands in the Chile market like:

- Alto del Carmen
- Artesanos del Cochiguaz
- Valle del Limarí

In addition Capel opened up its scope in 2006 producing numerous types of alcoholic beverages under the brand Capel drinks, including bottled caipirinha, and rum.
