= Flag of Coquimbo Region =

Coquimbo
- Use: State flag
- Proportion: 2:3
- Adopted: December 27, 2013; 12 years ago

The flag used by the Coquimbo Region in Chile was adopted in 2013. Previously, the region had only an unofficial flag consisting of a coat of arms in the center of a blue background.

Old unofficial flag

The design consists of a pattern representing the main geographical features of the area. Blue stripes with a white star in the lower hoist corner symbolize astronomical observatories. Four circles on a blue background form the constellation of the Southern Cross. In the upper fly, a yellow sun over a green land with stripes symbolizes agriculture and pisco production. All colors are presented as gradients.

The design on the flag corresponds to the logo of the Coquimbo Regional Government, developed by Conceptos Asociados Ltda., which was officially adopted by Resolution No. 729 of May 10, 2000.
