= Carmen de Andacollo =

Copper mine in Chile

- Location within Coquimbo Region Location within Chile

Location
- Location: Coquimbo Region, Chile; 30°15′0.65″S 71°5′38.23″W

Production
- Products: Copper

History
- Opened: 1994

Owner
- Company: Compañía Minera Carmen de Andacollo: Teck Resources (90%); ENAMI (10%)

Carmen de Andacollo is an open-pit copper mine in northern Chile next to the town of Andacollo and about 40 km southeast of the port city of Coquimbo. Teck Resources owns 90% of the mine while state-owned ENAMI owns the rest. The mine opened in 1996. In 2023 it produced 39,600 metric tons of copper concentrate. The ore mined belongs to the hypogene zone of the orebody.

The concentration of property to establish a large mine begun 1975 when Augusto Pinochet gave permission to ENAMI to purchase surface real estate from the inhabitants of Andacollo. Businessman Andrónico Luksic resisted the purchase of his property and he eventually acceded for a swap for a mining property in Los Pelambres. The mine property was put to into an international tender for a company willing to form a joint venture with ENAMI. Noranda Mines showed some interest but ultimately declined. A tender in 1990 ended in a similar maner with Placer Dome showing interest before declining. In 1994 after a new tender a joint venture of Carbon Tungsten and Compañía Minera del Pacífico (CMP) accepted the conditions of ENAMI, beginning the modern mine. At this point the ownership of the mining company Compañía Minera Carmen de Andacollo was as follows; Carbon Tungsten (63%), CMP (27%) and ENAMI (10%), with CMP itself being a joint-venture of steelmaking CAP and ENAMI. Production begun in 1994.

Soon, 63% of shares passed from Carbon Tungsten to Aur Resources, which years later in late 2006 increased its shares to 90% after purchasing them from CMP. In 2007 Aur Resources was purchased by Teck Cominco.

== Bibliography ==
- Danús, Hernán (2007). "V. La geología y las exploraciones mineras". Crónicas mineras de medio siglo (1950-2000) (in Spanish). Santiago de Chile: RIL Editores. ISBN 978-956-284-555-7.
