= Chañaral Island =

Island belonging to Chile

Coordinates: 29°02′S 71°35′W

Native name: Isla Chañaral

Geography
- Adjacent to: Pacific Ocean
- Area: 6.55 km^{2} (2.53 sq mi)

Administration
- Chile
- Region: Atacama Region
- Provinces of Chile: Huasco Province
- Communes of Chile: Freirina

Isla Chañaral (sometimes referred to as Isla Chanaral or Chanaral Island) is located 6 km off-shore from the northern Central Chilean coast, some 100 km north of the city of La Serena.

== Geography ==
Isla Chañaral is the biggest of the reserve's islands. Access to the island restricted by permit only. The island consists of two plateau levels. The main plateau between 50 and 70 meters above sea level is divided into a western and an eastern part by a second high plateau (>100 m). The vegetation of the plateaus differs considerably. While the main plateau is dominated by shrub and cacti the high plateau has a barren appearance with only few small cactus aggregations.

== Penguin reserve ==
Together with Isla Choros and Isla Damas, the island forms the Humboldt Penguin National Reserve, which is administered by the Chilean Forestry Corporation. All three islands support populations of Humboldt penguins, but are also habitat for several other rare and endangered animal species such as the Peruvian diving petrel or the South American marine otter. The reserve has been designated an Important Bird Area (IBA) by BirdLife International because it supports significant populations of Humboldt penguins and Peruvian diving-petrels.

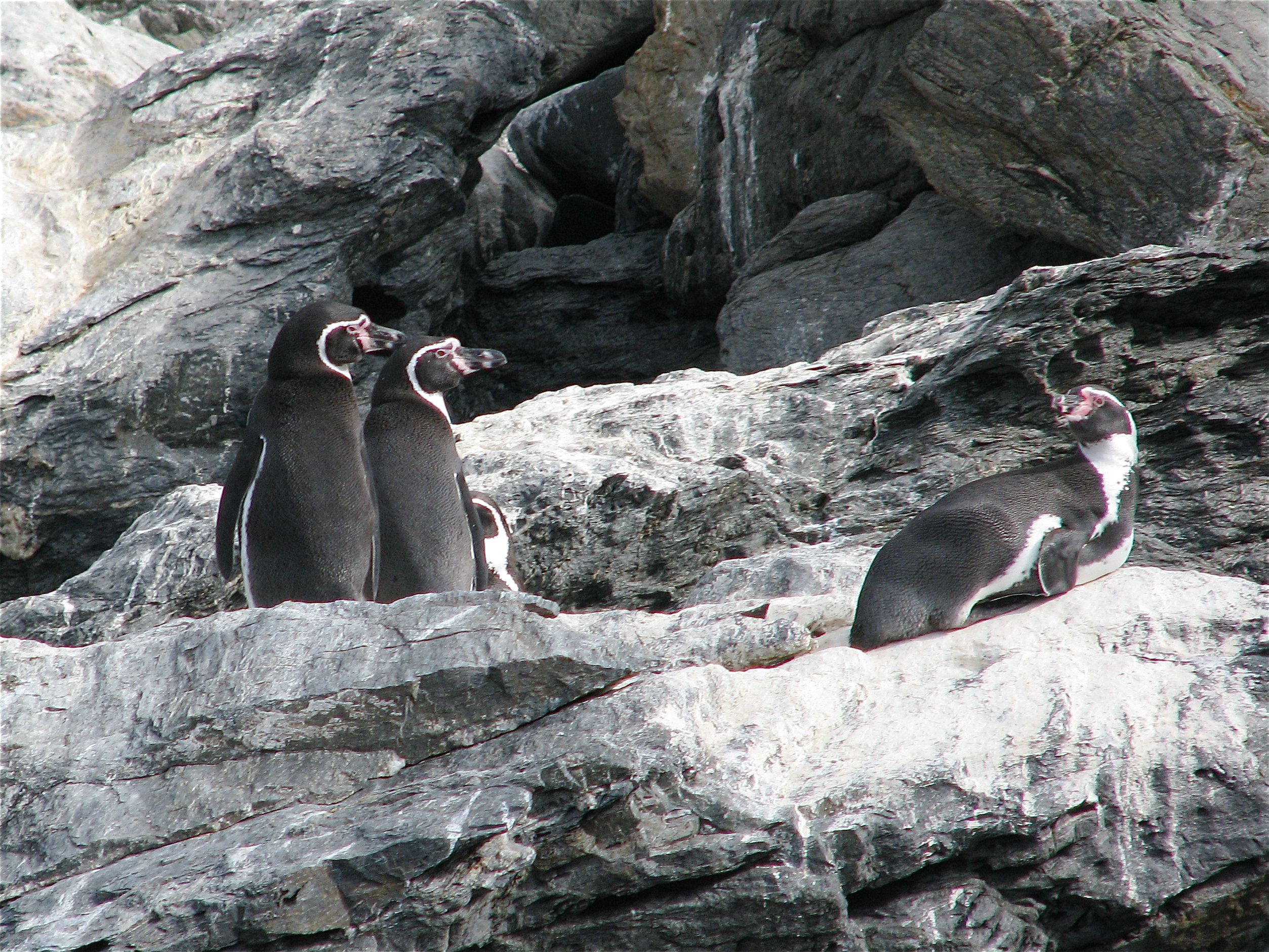
Humboldt penguins in the reserve

== Tourism ==
In recent years the reserve has experienced a strong increase in tourist activities, mainly due to being an important feeding ground in the summer months of different marine mammal species like fin whales, blue whales, humpback whales, and bottlenose dolphins that reside in the waters of the reserve. The local fishermen formed an association in cooperation with the National Tourism Service Sernatur to conduct whale watching activities in a sustainable manner, implementing responsible whale watching guidelines.

== External links and references ==
- Chanaral Island: the biggest Humboldt Penguin Colony in the world
- The Humboldt Penguin Colonies at Chanaral Island, Chile
- Humboldt penguins from the International Penguin Conservation Web Site
