= Pingüino de Humboldt National Reserve =

National reserve in Chile

- IUCN category IV (habitat/species management area)
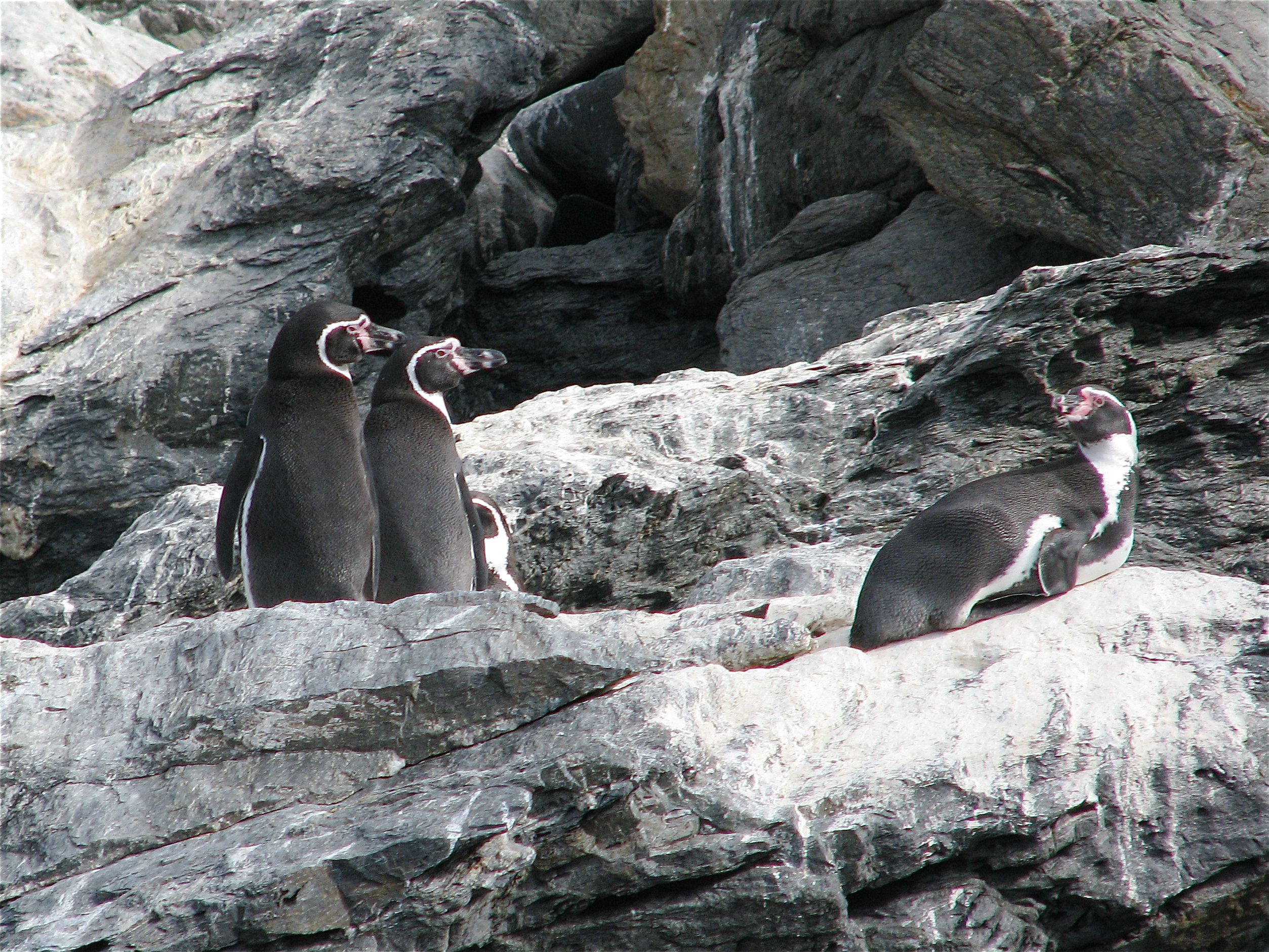
- Humboldt penguins on Choros island, Pingüino de Humboldt National Reserve, Chile.

- Location within Chile
- Location: Coquimbo Region, Chile
- Coordinates: 29°15′07″S 71°32′20″W
- Area: 8.59 km^{2} (3.32 sq mi)
- Designation: National reserve
- Designated: 1990
- Governing body: Corporación Nacional Forestal (CONAF)
- Website: Website

Pingüino de Humboldt National Reserve is a nature reserve located a short distance off the coast of mainland Chile. It consists of three islands: Chañaral, Damas, and Choros. It is located about 100 km (62 mi) north of La Serena in the Coquimbo Region of Chile and has a total area of 859.3 hectares (2,123 acres). Coastal communities of Caleta Chañaral, Chañaral de Aceituno, and Punta de Choros are nearby. The reserve is an important breeding site for the Humboldt penguin, for which it is named, and is a habitat for sea lions and bottlenose dolphins, chungungos (marine otters), sea turtle, whale, albatross and cormorant. Aside from dolphins, local cetacean diversity includes migratory rorquals such as blue, fin, and humpback whales, and sperm whales.

== Location ==
The park is located in both Atacama and Coquimbo regions of Chile. The reserve includes the Aceituno de Chañaral Island (Atacama Region) and Damas and Choros Islands (Coquimbo Region).

It is part of the Sistema Nacional de Áreas Silvestres Protegidas del Estado de Chile (National System of Protected Areas of the State of Chile), administered by the Corporación Nacional Forestal (National Forest Service, CONAF).

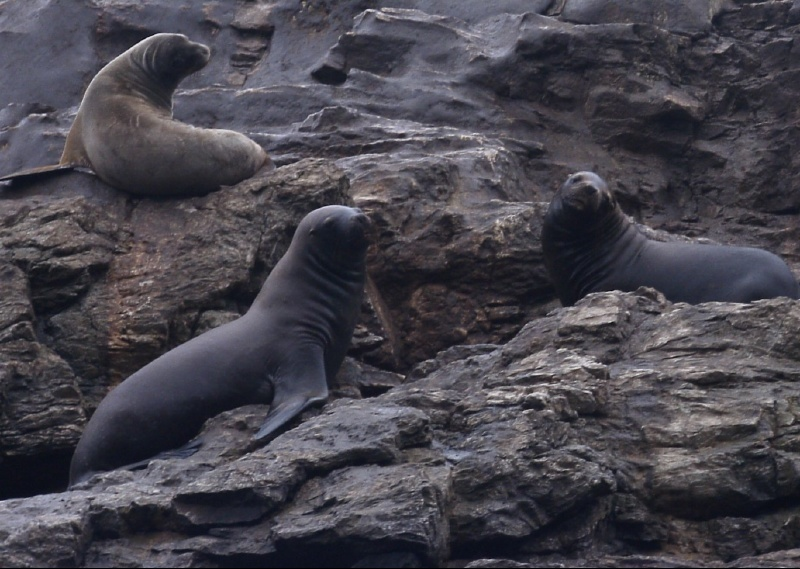
Sea lions on Choros island, Pingüino de Humboldt National Reserve, Chile.

== Choros Island ==
In 2013, the Chilean National Forestry Corporation (CONAF), in collaboration with Island Conservation, removed invasive rabbits from Choros Island benefiting the Humboldt penguin, Peruvian diving petrel, and the local eco-tourism industry. Since 2014, the return of fields of Alstroemeria philippii and the increase in Peruvian diving petrels seeking out burrows signalled a return to ecological health. In 2018, the partners declared the removal of invasive rabbits from the Humboldt Penguin National Reserve a success.

== Damas Island ==
Damas Island measures 60.3 hectares and much of its charm lies in its Caribbean style beaches. However, the water is fairly cold due to the Humboldt current.

Damas Island is the only place that has camping and picnicking facilities and to get there you have to contract the services of fishermen in the vicinity of Punta de Choros cove.

== Climate ==
The climate is considered semiarid because it is arid by the north and mild by the south. The shore temperatures are homogeneous, meanwhile in the interior the temperature oscillates between day and night time. Rain during winter season.

== Access routes ==
From La Serena, Chile advance on the road 75 km. to the turnoff leading to the village of Los Choros. From here, walk 45 km. by dirt road, which in its last 5 km. goes through a difficult transition dune.

== Registration ==
National Forestry Corporation (CONAF) registration is required at Punta de Choros. The next step is to hire one of the boats going out to the reserve's main attractions, Isla Damas, Isla Choros and Isla Chañaral.

== Admission ==
Entrance is $1600 Chilean pesos for adults, and $600 Chilean pesos for kids.
