= Apyrauna =

Scientific classification
- Domain: Eukaryota
- Kingdom: Animalia
- Phylum: Arthropoda
- Class: Insecta
- Order: Coleoptera
- Suborder: Polyphaga
- Infraorder: Cucujiformia
- Family: Cerambycidae
- Subfamily: Cerambycinae
- Tribe: Elaphidiini
- Genus: Apyrauna; Martins, 2005

Genus of beetles

Apyrauna is a genus of beetles in the family Cerambycidae, containing the following species:

- Apyrauna annulicornis Martins, 2005
- Apyrauna maculicorne (Germain, 1898)
