= Claro River (Elqui) =

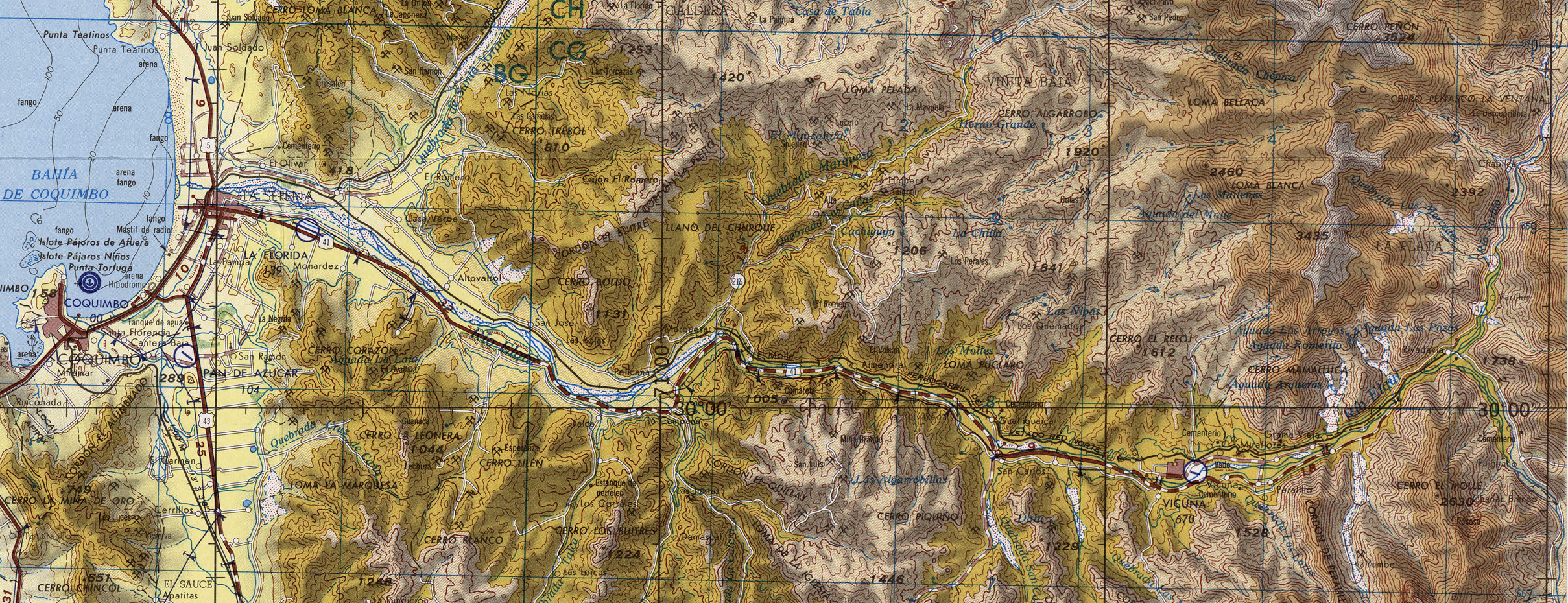
- Claro River (right below) and Turbio River (Elqui) (right above) flow into the Elqui River (left)

Location
- Country: Chile

The Claro River (Elqui) is a river of Chile.

== See also ==
- List of rivers of Chile
