= Monte Patria =

- City and Commune
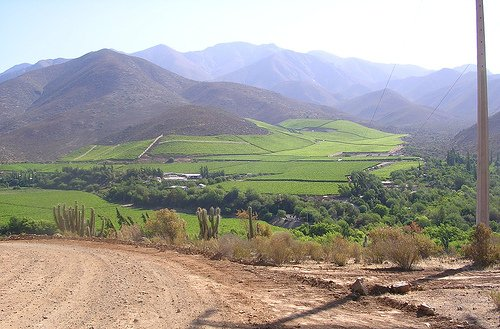

- Coat of arms Location in Chile
- Coordinates: 30°50′S 70°42′W
- Country: Chile
- Region: Coquimbo
- Province: Limarí

Government
  - Type: Municipality
  - Alcalde: Juan Carlos Castillo

Area
  - Total: 4,366.3 km^{2} (1,685.8 sq mi)
  - Rank: 1
- Elevation: 1,046 m (3,432 ft)

Population (2012 Census)
  - Total: 30,056
  - Rank: 2
  - Density: 6.8836/km^{2} (17.829/sq mi)
  - Urban: 13,340
  - Rural: 16,936

Sex
  - Men: 15,351
  - Women: 14,925
- Time zone: UTC−4 (CLT)
  - Summer (DST): UTC−3 (CLST)
- Area code: 56 + 53
- Website: Municipality of Monte Patria

Monte Patria is a city and one of four communes in the Limarí Province of Chile's north-central Coquimbo Region.

== Administration ==
As a commune, Monte Patria is a third-level administrative division of Chile administered by a Communal Council (Spanish: Consejo Comunal), headed by a directly elected alcalde. As of 2010, the alcalde is Juan Carlos Castillo.

Monte Patria belongs to the 9th electoral district and the 4th Senate District (Coquimbo Region). It is represented in the Chamber of Deputies of the National Congress by the Members Adriana Muñoz (PPD) and Luis Lemus (PRI). Currently, Coquimbo is represented in the Senate by Jorge Pizarro (PDC) and Evelyn Matthei (UDI).

== Geography ==
Monte Patria spans an area of 4,366.3 km (2,713 mi).

== Demographics ==
According to data from the 2002 Census of Population and Housing, the Monte Patria commune had 30,276 inhabitants; of these, 13,340 (44.1%) lived in urban areas and 16,936 (55.9%) in rural areas. Thus, the Monte Patria population represents 5.1% of regional population and 19.2% of the provincial population. At that time, there were 15,351 men and 14,925 women residing in the commune.
