= Paiguano =

Paiguano Paihuano
- Town and Commune
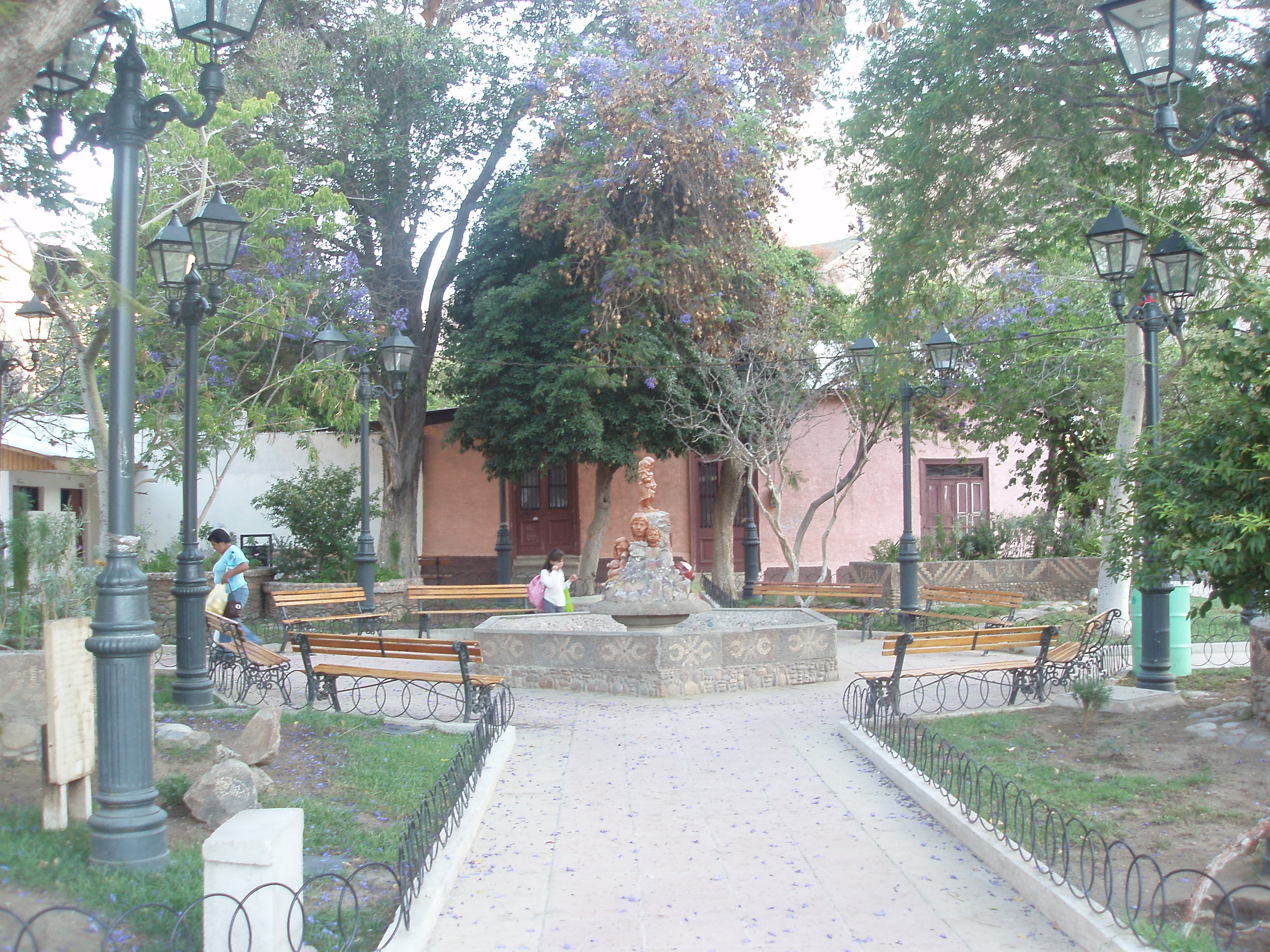

- Map of Paiguano commune in the Coquimbo Region Location in Chile
- Coordinates (city): 30°01′S 70°32′W
- Country: Chile
- Region: Coquimbo
- Province: Elqui

Government
  - Type: Municipality

Area
  - Total: 1,494.7 km^{2} (577.1 sq mi)
- Elevation: 1,063 m (3,488 ft)

Population (2012 Census)
  - Total: 4,256
  - Density: 2.847/km^{2} (7.375/sq mi)
  - Urban: 0
  - Rural: 4,168

Sex
  - Men: 2,145
  - Women: 2,023
- Time zone: UTC-4 (CLT)
  - Summer (DST): UTC-3 (CLST)
- Area code: (+56) 51
- Website: www.municipalidaddepaihuano.cl

Paiguano (Spanish pronunciation: [pajˈɣwano]) or Paihuano ([pajˈwano]) is a small agricultural town and commune in the Elqui Province of the Coquimbo Region of Chile.

== Demographics ==
According to the 2002 census of the National Statistics Institute, Paiguano had 4,168 inhabitants (2,145 men and 2,023 women), making the commune an entirely rural area. The population grew by 10.5% (396 persons) between the 1992 and 2002 censuses.

== Administration ==
As a commune, Paiguano is a third-level administrative division of Chile administered by a municipal council, headed by an alcalde who is directly elected every four years.

Within the electoral divisions of Chile, Paiguano is represented in the Chamber of Deputies by Mr. Mario Bertolino (RN) and Marcelo Díaz (PS) as part of the 7th electoral district, (together with La Serena, La Higuera, Vicuña and Andacollo). The commune is represented in the Senate by Evelyn Matthei Fornet (UDI) and Jorge Pizarro Soto (PDC) as part of the 4th senatorial constituency (Coquimbo Region).

== Patriotic Celebrations ==
Paiguano is one of the main locations to celebrate Chile's patriotic holiday on September 18.

== See also ==
- List of towns in Chile
