= Elqui Province =

Elqui Province Provincia de Elqui
- Province
- Seal

- Location in the Coquimbo Region

- Location in Chile
- Coordinates: 29°40′S 70°33′W
- Country: Chile
- Region: Coquimbo
- Capital: Coquimbo
- Communes: List of 6: Andacollo; Coquimbo; La Higuera; La Serena; Paihuano; Vicuña

Government
  - Type: Provincial

Area
  - Total: 16,895.1 km^{2} (6,523.2 sq mi)

Population (2024)
  - Total: 562,457
  - Density: 33.2911/km^{2} (86.2236/sq mi)
- Time zone: UTC−4 (CLT)
  - Summer (DST): UTC−3 (CLST)
- Area code: 56 + 51
- ISO 3166 code: CL-CO

Elqui Province (Spanish: Provincia de Elqui [ˈelki]) is a province in the Coquimbo Region of Chile. Its capital is Coquimbo. Spread over an area of 16,895.1 km^{2} (6,523.2 sq mi), it had a population of 562,457 inhabitants as per the 2024 Chilean census. The province was established by law on 1 August 1974.

== History ==
The Coquimbo Region was established on 1 August 1974, from the erstwhile Intendency of Coquimbo, which had been established on 23 September 1811. It is divided into three provinces: Elqui, Limarí and Choapas, which are further divided into 18 communes.

== Geography ==
Elqui Province is one of the provinces of the Coquimbo Region in Chile. It spans an area of 16,895.1 km^{2} (6,523.2 sq mi) and has its capital at Coquimbo. It is located in the Elqui Valley, which is one of the major wine producing regions in Chile. Located at the end of the Atacama Desert, the valley has one of the clearest skies, which attracts stargazers. About 57% of the land area of the province is part of the Elqui River basin, 20% of the land area forms part of the Los Chorros River basin. The village of Pisco Elqui is popular for the manufacture of Pisco, a type of brandy made from grapes.

The province is divided into six communes–Andacollo, Coquimbo, La Higuera, La Serena, Paihuano, and Vicuña.

=== Climate ===
Elqui has a Mediterranean climate (Classification: Csb) with an average annual temperature of 18.4 °C (65.1 °F). It receives an average of 11.16 mm (0.439 in) of precipitation annually.

== Demographics ==
According to the 2024 Chilean census, Elqui Province had a population of 562,457 inhabitants. The population consisted of 289,977 females (51.6%) and 272,480 males (48.4%). About 18.7% of the population was below the age of 15 years, 67.9% belonged to the age group of 15–64 years, and 13.4% was aged 65 years or older. The province had an urban population of 492,369 inhabitants (87.5%) and a rural population of 70,088 inhabitants (12.5%). Most of the residents were born in Chile, accounting for 528,336 inhabitants (93.9%). Non-indigenous people formed the majority of the population with 505,603 inhabitants (89.9%), while 56,782 inhabitants (10.1%) identified themselves as belonging to indigenous groups. Roman Catholics formed the largest religious group with 277,612 adherents (61%), followed by 118,268 inhabitants (26%) indicating no religious affiliation, and Evangelicals or Protestants with 37,557 adherents (8.3%).
