= Coquimbo Region =

Region of Chile

Coquimbo Region Región de Coquimbo
- Region of Chile
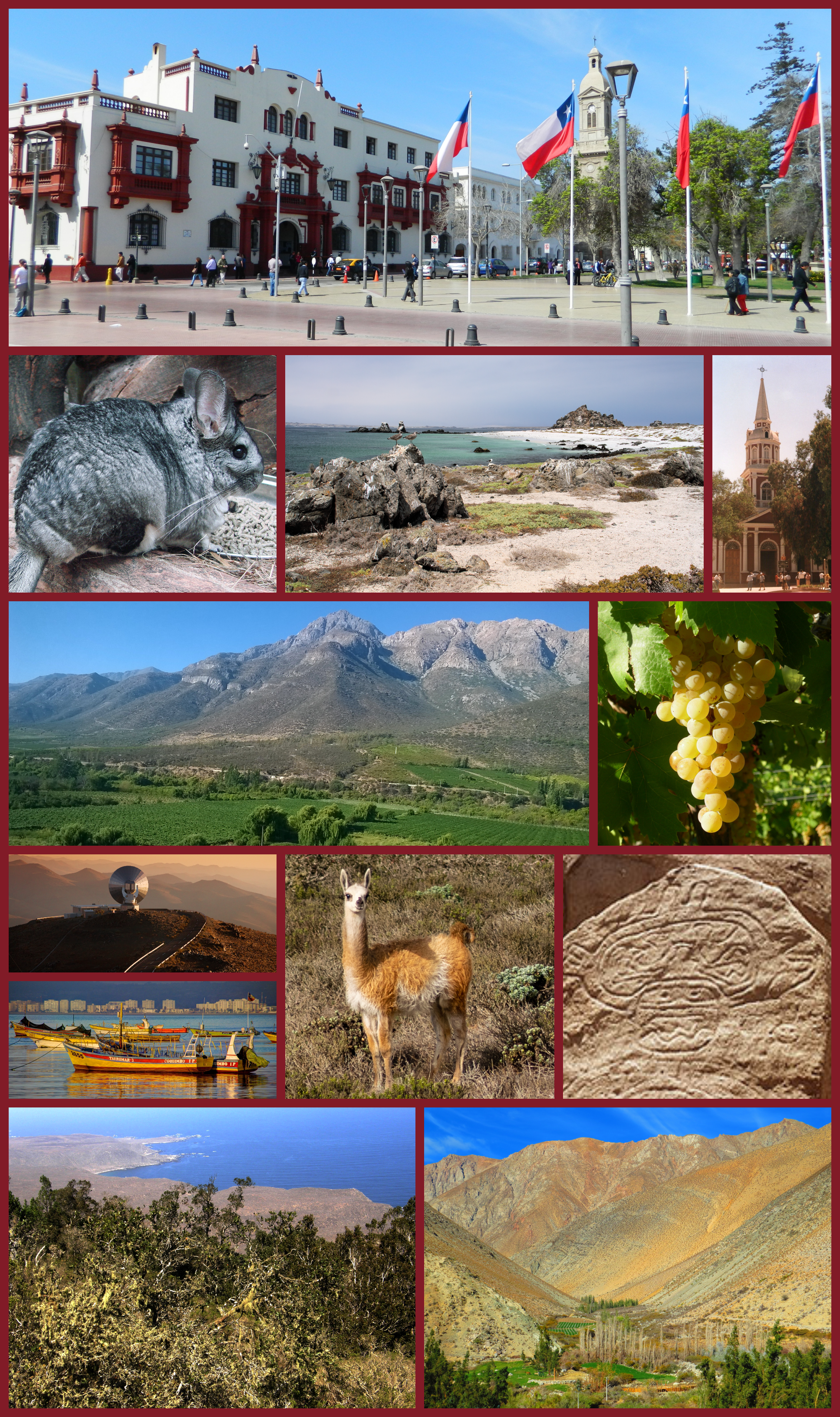
- Montage of Coquimbo Region

- Flag Seal Coat of arms

- Map of Coquimbo Región - Chile
- Coordinates: 29°54′28″S 70°15′15″W
- Country: Chile
- Capital: La Serena
- Largest city: Coquimbo
- Provinces: Elqui, Limarí, Choapa

Government
  - Governor: Cristóbal Juliá (Ind.)
  - Presidential delegate: Víctor Pino (Ind.)

Area
  - Total: 40,579.9 km^{2} (15,668.0 sq mi)
  - Rank: 7
- Highest elevation: 6,216 m (20,394 ft)
- Lowest elevation: 0 m (0 ft)

Population (2024 census)
  - Total: 832,864
  - Rank: 8
  - Density: 20.5241/km^{2} (53.1571/sq mi)

GDP (PPP)
  - Total: $11.237 billion (2014)
  - Per capita: $14,800 (2014)
- ISO 3166 code: CL-CO
- HDI (2022): 0.838 very high
- Website: Official website (in Spanish)

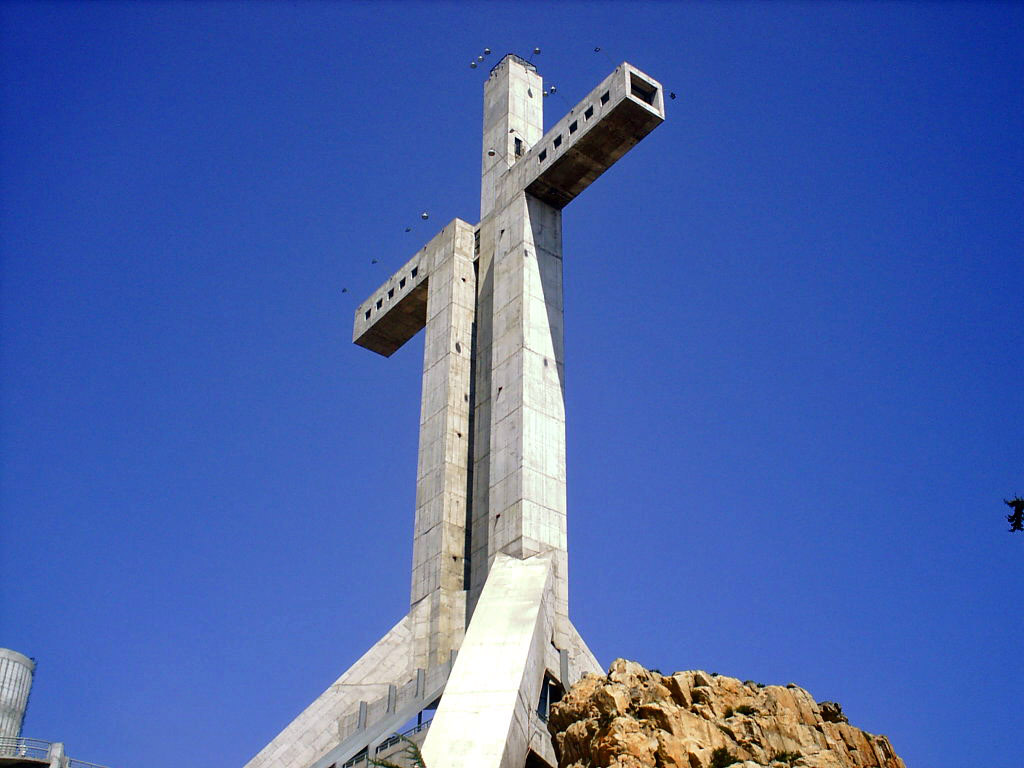
Cruz del Tercer Milenio in Coquimbo.

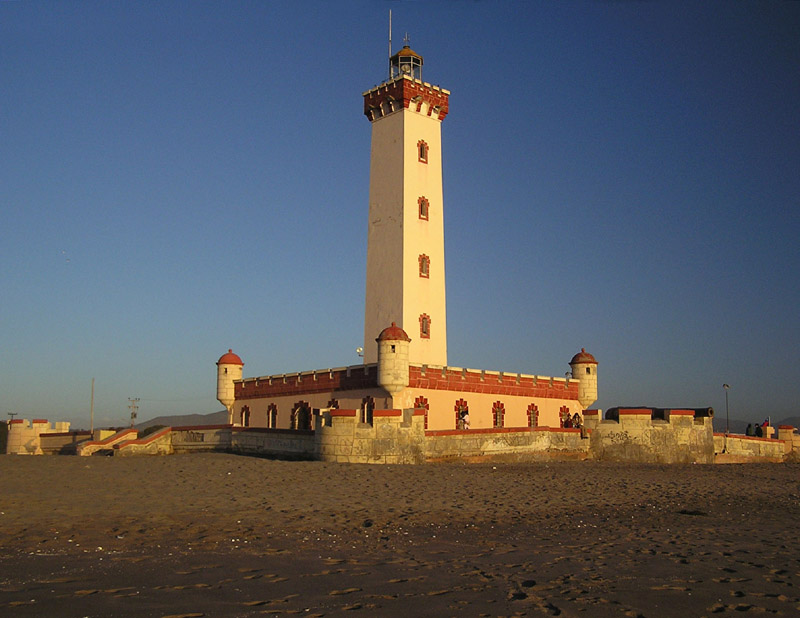
El Faro in La Serena.

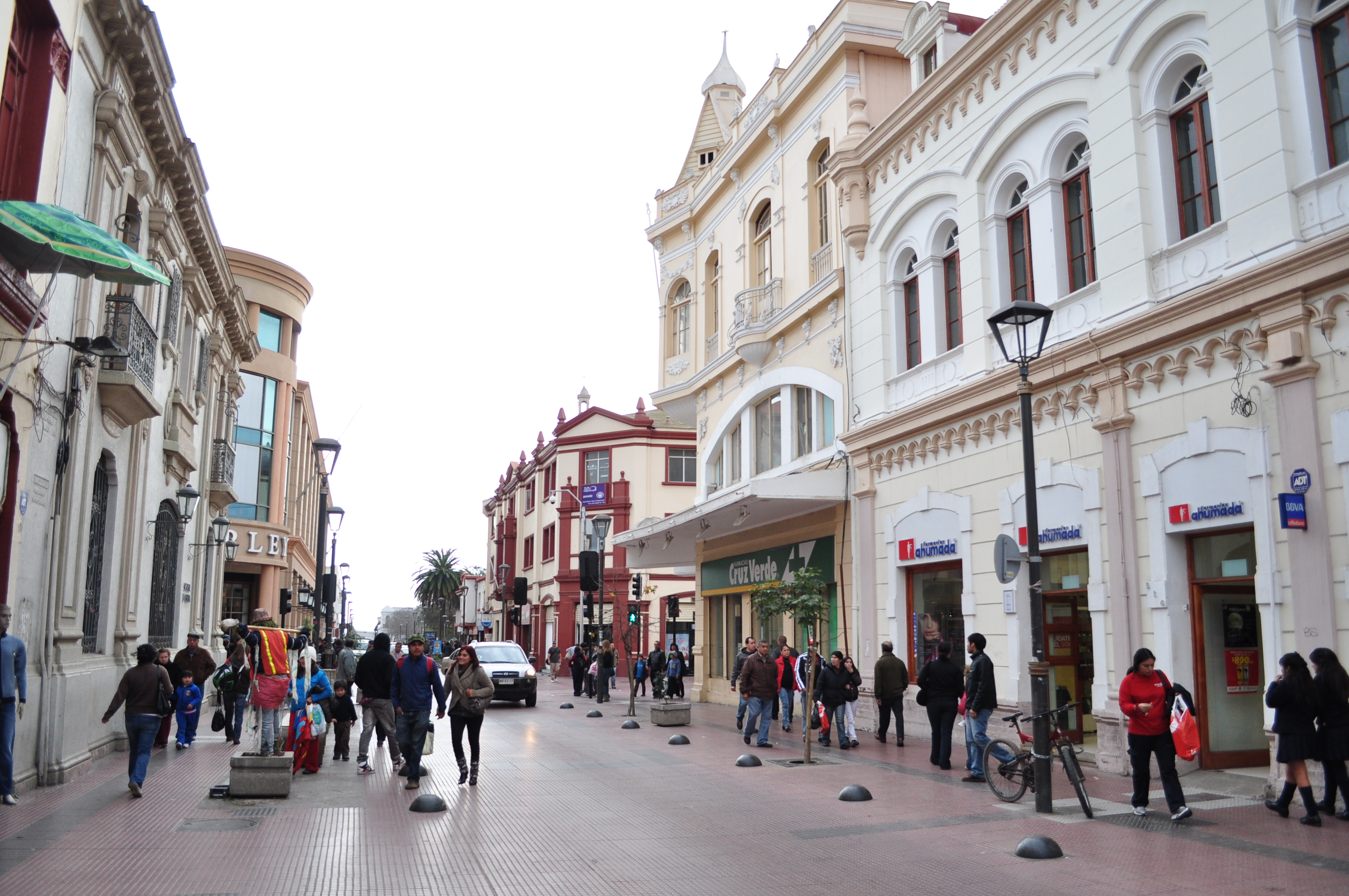
Historic Centre of La Serena.

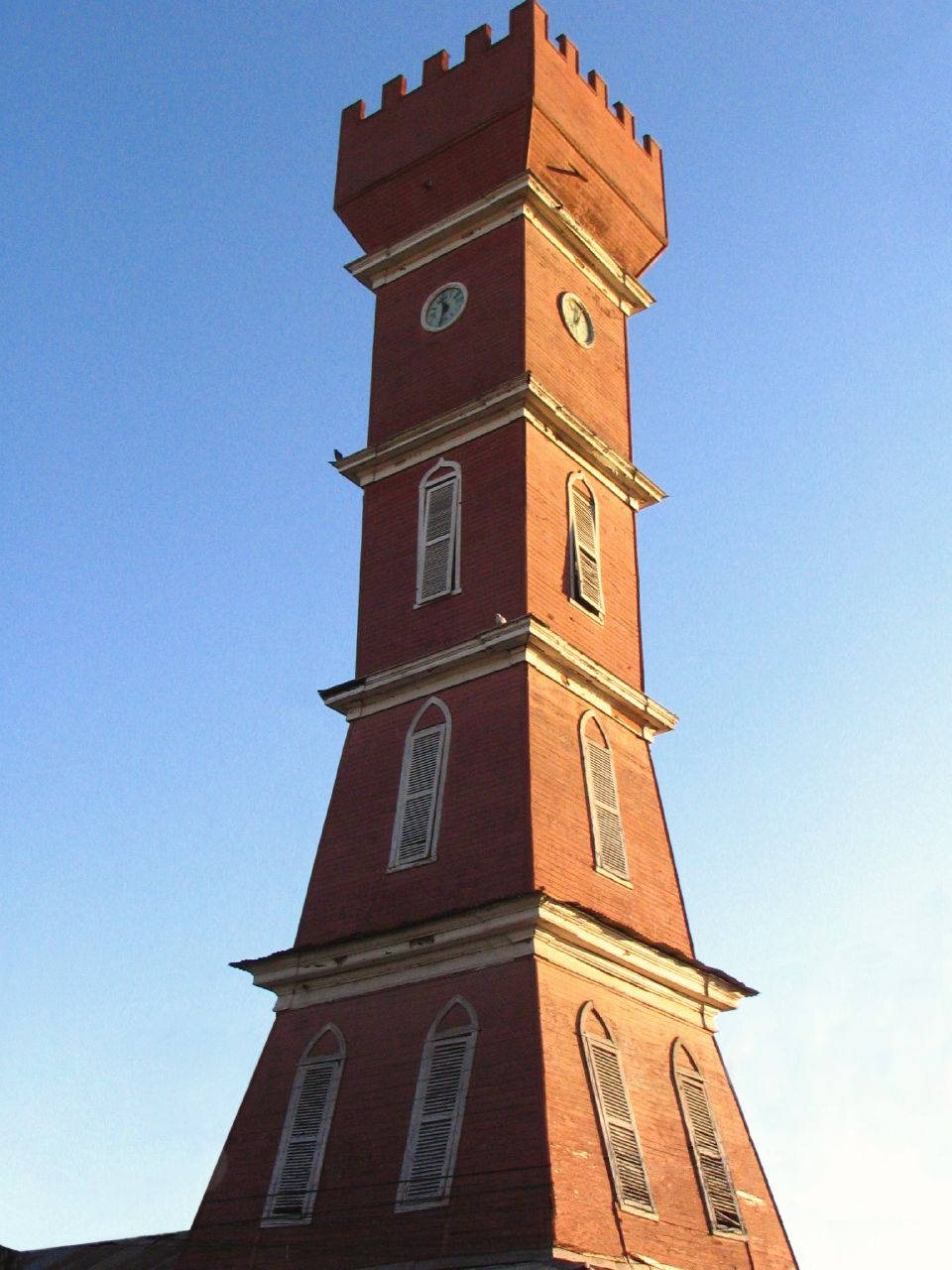
Bauer's Tower of Vicuña.

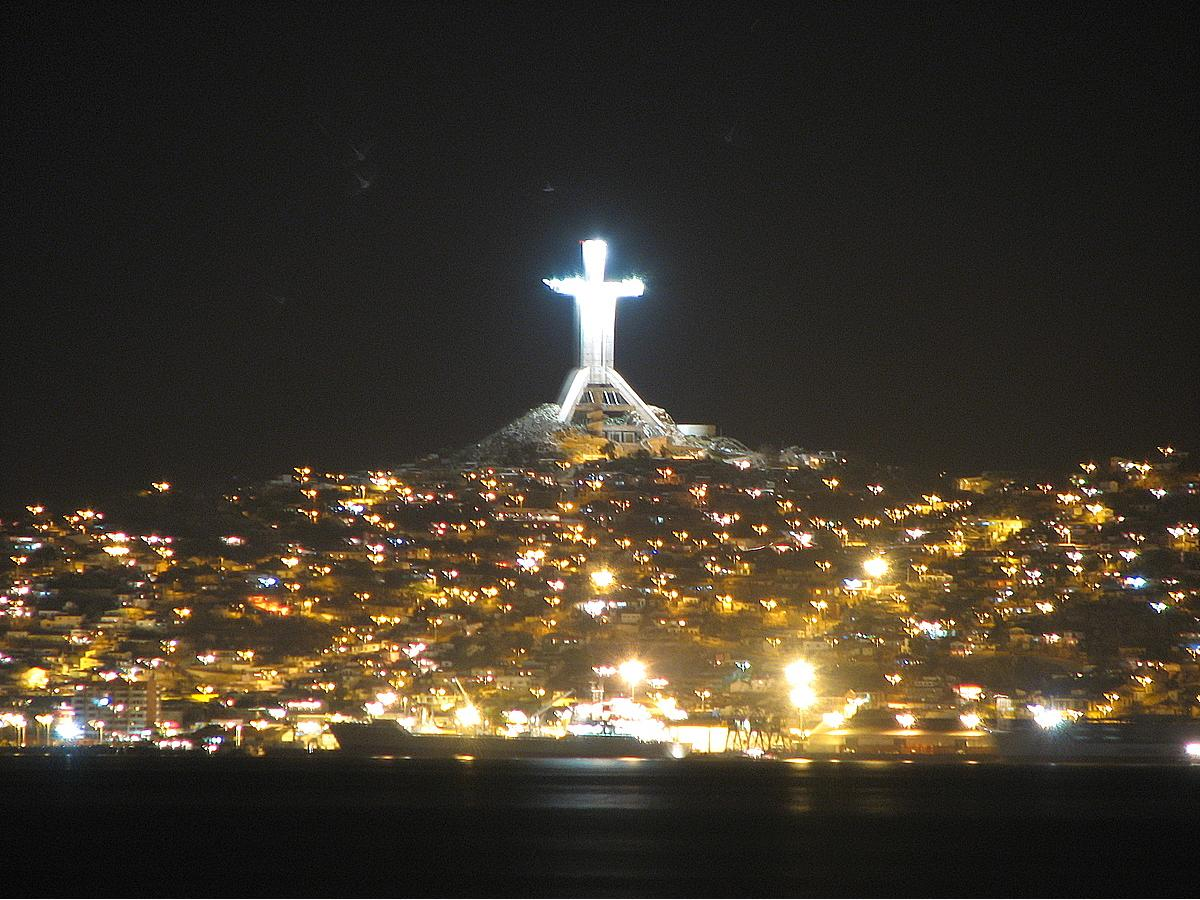
Night view of Coquimbo's port.

The Coquimbo Region (Spanish: Región de Coquimbo, pronounced [koˈkimbo]) is one of Chile's 16 administrative regions. It is located approximately 400 kilometres (250 mi) north of the national capital, Santiago. The region is bordered by the Atacama Region to the north, the Valparaíso Region to the south, Argentina to the east, and the Pacific Ocean to the west.

The capital is La Serena, and the largest city is Coquimbo. Other significant cities include Ovalle, a center for agriculture, and Illapel.

== History ==
From the third century onward, the area was inhabited by the indigenous Molle, Ánimas, and Diaguita peoples, who established various settlements in the valleys stretching from the Andes to the sea and were primarily agricultural communities. Along the coast, a nomadic people later known as the Chango or Camanchaco settled, making their living through fishing.

The region traces its origins to the huamani (or sichi) of Coquimbo. Toward the end of the 15th century, the area was incorporated into the Inca Empire, which conquered and ruled the Diaguita people. The Inca governor established his seat in the Coquimbo Valley, from where he administered the region. This political territory extended from the Copiapó Valley to the Limarí Valley, bordered by the huamani of Collao to the north and Chile to the south. From this period onward, the valley and the region came to be known as Coquimbo, probably derived from the Quechua words qullqi ("silver") and tanpu ("tambo" or roadside inn).

The region was explored by the Spanish under the command of Diego de Almagro in 1536 during the Discovery of Chile, although its inhabitants reportedly reacted with hostility to their presence. Upon entering the Coquimbo Valley, Almagro ordered the execution of 30 native leaders from nearby villages, including the local Inca governor, in retaliation for the deaths of three of his men. This event, together with the European destruction of the Inca Empire, marked the decline of Inca political influence in the valley. As part of Almagro's expedition, Los Vilos served as an improvised supply port for a small ship called San Pedro, commanded by Alonso de Quintero.

In 1540, Pedro de Valdivia, during his campaign to conquer Chile, crossed the region on his way to the Mapocho Valley, where he would found the city of Santiago de la Nueva Extremadura.

Because of the long and hazardous journey between Santiago and Lima, Pedro de Valdivia ordered Juan Bohón to found La Serena in 1543 or 1544, approximately 475 kilometers (295 miles) north of Santiago. In 1549, La Serena was burned and destroyed by indigenous groups but was rebuilt later that same year by Francisco de Aguirre. After the city's consolidation, the Spanish organized the territory as the Corregimiento of Coquimbo, transferring its political center from the Coquimbo Valley to the city of La Serena, which during the colonial period and part of the 19th century was also known as the city of Coquimbo. The boundaries of the corregimiento were similar to those during Inca rule, extending from Atacama in the north and now including Choapa in the south.

At the end of the 16th century, due to the decline in the native population, hundreds of Mapuche were relocated to the Coquimbo Valley and La Serena. This measure was intended both to exile and disperse groups resisting Spanish conquest during the Arauco War and to address labor shortages on the region's estates and in its mines.

In 1786, as a result of the Bourbon Reforms implemented in Chile, the Corregimiento of Coquimbo became the District (Partido) of Coquimbo, which fell under the jurisdiction of the Intendancy of Santiago.

As a republican political-administrative division, the Coquimbo Region originated from the Intendancy of Coquimbo, established on September 23, 1811, by the First National Congress. It joined the existing colonial intendancies of Santiago and Concepción, becoming one of the three regions that initially formed Chile during its struggle for independence. On August 30, 1826, under the Federal Laws, the Province of Coquimbo was created from the former Intendancy of Coquimbo, alongside seven other provinces: Aconcagua, Santiago, Colchagua, Maule, Concepción, Valdivia, and Chiloé.

The Constitution of 1828 maintained Chile's division into eight provinces. In 1843, the Province of Atacama was created by separating the northern portion of the Province of Coquimbo. In the following years, additional departments were established.

Under the Municipalities Creation Decree of 1891, the departments were subdivided into new municipalities. In 1927, Decree with Force of Law (DFL) No. 8582, issued on December 30, reorganized the province, while DFL No. 8583 established the commune-subdelegations.

In 1974, as part of Chile's regionalization process, the Province of Coquimbo, with its capital at La Serena and comprising the departments of La Serena, Elqui, Coquimbo, Ovalle, Combarbalá, and Illapel, along with the communes of La Serena, La Higuera, Vicuña, Paihuano, Coquimbo, Andacollo, Ovalle, Monte Patria, Punitaqui, Samo Alto, Combarbalá, Illapel, Mincha, Salamanca, and Los Vilos, was transformed into the IV Region of Coquimbo. The new administrative region was divided into the three provinces of Elqui, Limarí, and Choapa.

== Geography ==
The Coquimbo Region forms the narrowest part of Chile and is one of the most mountainous areas in the country, as the Andes range lies closer to the sea here than in other regions. The region is home to diverse marine and terrestrial species. Upwelling along the coast fosters high marine productivity, contributing to a rich ecosystem.

In the southern mountainous areas, the endangered Chilean Wine Palm (Jubaea chilensis) can be found. Its habitat is under threat from human activities, such as population growth and deforestation for agriculture and urban expansion.

The Elqui Valley, known for its clear skies, is home to numerous astronomical observatories. Additionally, the Puclaro Dam, a 640-meter-long structure, contains a reservoir that holds 4.63 million cubic meters of water for agricultural irrigation along the Elqui River.

== Demography ==
Mining and agriculture have shaped the distribution of settlements in the Coquimbo Region, particularly around transverse valleys and mineral deposits. Historically, these settlements corresponded to the locations of Diaguita indigenous villages. A significant portion of the population, around 70-75%, is of Mestizo (Euro-Amerindian) descent, the highest percentage in Chile. Other indigenous groups present in the region include the Aymara, Atacameño, Mapuche, and Quechua, many of whom except Mapuche migrated from Peru and Bolivia.

The La Serena-Coquimbo conurbation, with an estimated population of around 300,000 people (297,253 as of the last census), accounts for about half of the region's total population. Other major urban centers include Ovalle (118,696), Illapel (32,009), Monte Patria (29,997), Vicuña (28,047), Salamanca (27,823), and Los Vilos (22,897), based on data from the 2024 census.

== Economy ==
The Coquimbo Region is a popular tourist destination, known for its long, white-sand, beaches, and for its mild climate. The region's economy is also supported by agriculture and fishing. Additionally, its mountainous terrain makes it a key location for astronomical research.

The region hosts the iron mines of El Romeral, near La Serena and El Dorado near Ovalle, in addition to the copper mines of Panulcillo also near Ovalle, Carmen de Andacollo next to Andacollo and Los Pelambres in the high Andes near the Argentina–Chile border. The Dominga copper-iron mine project lies in the region.

Until 2009, when mining of manganese ceased in Chile, Coquimbo Region produced all of manganese in the country. All the manganese mining districts of the region lie inland. Historically Corral Quemado and other areas of Coquimbo Region have produced the most manganese. Manganese mining in Chile, and Corral Quemado, had a strong peak in 1943 when it produced more than was being purchased, leading to large stockpiles accumulating in ports and railway stations, which led to a halt in mining and thus mass unemployment.

== Media and communications ==
The first newspaper in the region, El Minero de Coquimbo, was published in 1828. Today, the region is served by several local newspapers, including El Día in La Serena, founded in 1944, La Región in Coquimbo, founded in 2004, and El Ovallino, founded in 1989 in Ovalle.

TVN Red Coquimbo, a regional affiliate of Televisión Nacional de Chile (TVN), began broadcasting in 1993. Several local cable and UHF television channels, such as CuartaVisión and Ovalle TV, offer regional programming that includes news, sports, and cultural content. However, several regional stations have ceased operations, including Telenorte and Canal 8 UCV TV, which broadcast until 2001 and 2002, respectively.

== Notable people ==
The Coquimbo Region is the birthplace of several notable figures, including:

- Gabriela Mistral, the Nobel Laureate poet, who was born in Vicuña, a town in the Elqui Valley known for pisco production.
- Hermann Niemeyer, a pediatrician and biochemist born in Ovalle in 1918, who played a key role in the development of biochemistry in Chile.
