= Elqui Valley (wine region) =

The Elqui Valley is a wine region situated alongside the Elqui River in northern Chile. The region lies 400 km (250 mi) north of Santiago, at the southern end of the Atacama Desert in the Coquimbo region. It is known for cultivating table grapes, various fruits, and Chile’s popular pisco brandy, the country's favored liquor. It is considered the most commercially successful wine-producing region in northern Chile.

The region’s vineyards extend from the Pacific Ocean in the west to the Andes Mountains in the east, and rise to an elevation of 2,000 meters above sea level (6,500 feet). Viticulture in the Elqui Valley began in the 1990s when Chilean wine producers sought potential sites beyond the Chilean Central Valley. Over the years, they have planted 286 hectares (710 acres) of vines, primarily along the Elqui River valley, where grape growers have access to high-quality water for irrigation.

The region has clay, silt and chalk soil, and is characterized by a sunny, desert-like climate with less than 70 millimetres (2.8 in) of annual rainfall. The landscape features dry rocky terrain, steep valleys, and temperate hills cooled by strong winds from the Pacific Ocean and the Andes Mountains. These conditions contribute to the production of excellent results for varietals like Syrah.

The Elqui Valley has been granted the Denomination of Origin (DO) status within the Chilean appellation system. This legally protected geographical indication allows for identifying the specific location where the grapes used in the wine were grown.

== Grape distribution by varietal ==
Cabernet Sauvignon: 25 ha (62 acres)	Sauvignon Blanc: 72 ha (178 acres)	Carmenere: 60 ha (148 acres)
Syrah: 87 ha (215 acres)	Pinot Noir: 19 ha (47 acres)	Chardonnay: 23 ha (57 acres)
