= Daniel Manouchehri =

Chilean politician

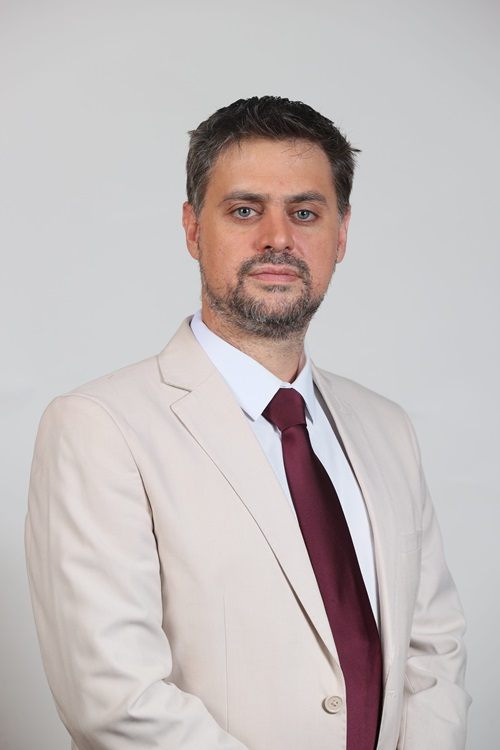
- Official portrait, 2026

Member of the Chamber of Deputies
- Incumbent
- Assumed office 11 March 2022
- Constituency: District 5

Personal details
- Born: 25 May 1984 (age 42) Vienna, Austria
- Party: Socialist
- Children: Two
- Parent(s): Manouchehr Manouchehri; María Lobos
- Relatives: Alí Manouchehri (brother)
- Education: Diego Portales University (No degree); Universidad del Mar (LL.B); Autonomous University of Barcelona (MD)
- Occupation: Politician
- Profession: Lawyer

Daniel Manouchehri Moghadam Kashan Lobos (born 25 May 1984) is a Chilean lawyer and politician of the Socialist Party currently serving in the chamber of Deputies from District 5 of the Coquimbo Region since 2022.

== Family and early life ==
He was born on 25 May 1984 in Hietzing, Vienna, Austria. He is the son of Manouchehr Manouchehri Moghadam Kashan and María Lobos Inzunza.

He is the nephew of Marta Lobos Inzunza, former city councillor (2000–2004) and mayor of Ovalle (2004–2012), and of her husband, former deputy Francisco Encina. He is the brother of Ali Manouchehri, mayor of the Municipality of Coquimbo (2021–2025).

He is divorced and the father of two children.

== Professional career ==
He completed his primary and secondary education at Bernardo O’Higgins School in Coquimbo, graduating in 2003. He studied law at Diego Portales University and at the University of the Sea, where he earned a degree in legal and social sciences. He was admitted to the bar before the Supreme Court of Chile on 19 November 2014.

Between 2014 and 2015, he completed a master’s degree in Political and Electoral Communication Management at the Autonomous University of Barcelona.

Professionally, he has worked in strategic communications and social media, as well as in private legal practice. He also carried out duties within the Municipality of La Serena in late 2015, supporting public relations and events programs.

He has been a columnist for various media outlets, including The Clinic, La Nación, La Tercera, Red Mi Voz, El Periodista and El Quinto Poder.

== Political career ==
He began his political involvement in 1999 as president of the student council of Bernardo O’Higgins School and was among the founders of the Federation of Secondary Students of Coquimbo. That same year, he joined the Youth of the Socialist Party of Chile, eventually serving as vice-president, and acted as youth campaign coordinator for presidential candidate Ricardo Lagos in Coquimbo.

Between 2001 and 2003, he was active as a student leader. On 4 April 2001, he led the so-called *Mochilazo*, a nationwide student protest regarded as a precursor to the 2005 Penguin Revolution. In 2001, he was also elected president of the Chilean Youth Parliament.

In 2005, he served as national coordinator of the Youth Command for the presidential campaign of Michelle Bachelet and was vice-president of the Socialist Youth.

In the 2009 parliamentary elections, he ran as a candidate for the Chamber of Deputies of Chile representing the Socialist Party for the 8th electoral district (Coquimbo, Ovalle and Río Hurtado) in the Coquimbo Region for the 2010–2014 term. He obtained 14,753 votes (13.87%) but was not elected.

In July 2013, he announced a new candidacy for the Chamber of Deputies in the same district; however, it did not materialize due to the party’s decision not to hold primaries and to nominate another candidate.

Between 4 and 6 May 2011, he participated in the Encuentro de Líderes Políticos Emergentes (LIPEM) – Southern Cone, held in Buenos Aires, representing the Socialist Party and serving as president of the Ibero-American Socialist Youth.

In 2012, he became vice-president of the Socialist Party. During the second administration of President Michelle Bachelet, he worked at the Ministry General Secretariat of the Presidency.

He has been active in environmental protests in the Coquimbo Region, opposing the Barrancones thermoelectric project in 2013 and the Dominga mining project in 2021.

In August 2021, he registered his candidacy for the Chamber of Deputies representing the Socialist Party within the New Social Pact coalition for the 5th electoral district —comprising the communes of Andacollo, Canela, Combarbalá, Coquimbo, Illapel, La Higuera, La Serena, Los Vilos, Monte Patria, Ovalle, Paiguano, Punitaqui, Río Hurtado, Salamanca and Vicuña— in the Coquimbo Region for the 2022–2026 legislative term. He was elected with 12,292 votes, equivalent to 5.19% of the valid votes cast.
