= Cuz Cuz =

Village and archaeological site in Chile

Coordinates: 31°39′S 71°14′W

Cuz Cuz or Cuzcuz is a small village and an archaeological site which lies about 6 kilometers from the city of Illapel, Choapa Province, in the Coquimbo Region of Chile. It is important in Chilean history as the place where the treaty ending the Chilean Civil War of 1829 was signed.

== History ==
The first inhabitants of the area arrived during the Paleoindian Period (12000-8000 a.C) characterized by hunters of large size animals. Archaeological digs for this periods have been found in the Quereo site. The second period is the Archaic (8000 -200 a.C) with a population of hunters and gatherers. The third population period is the Agro-Potters with: a) the El Molle complex (130 a.C-700 d.C), b) Las Ánimas (800-1000 d.C) and c) Diaguita culture (1000-1536 d.C). Finally the Incas conquered this territory shortly before the arrival of the Spaniards, which establish their main population center about 5 kilometers away, at the confluence of the rivers Illapel and Choapa, founding the city of Illapel.

The Treaty of Cuz-Cuz, between the liberal and the Conservatives forces that brought an end the Chilean Civil War of 1829 was signed here.

== Tourism ==
Cuz-Cuz is home to one of the largest concentrations of petroglyphs from the El Molle culture. They are spread out over an area of approximately 35 square kilometers. This site seem to form part of a large ancient astronomical observatory, with the petroglyphs being their astronomical records.

May 15 is San Isidro Day in Cuz-Cuz. If the day falls on a Monday, the following Sunday is celebrated. Celebrations begin at noon with a Mass, followed by a procession and Chinese dances.

== See also ==
- List of reduplicated place names
