= Francisco Eguiguren Correa =

Chilean politician (born 1967)

Francisco Eguiguren
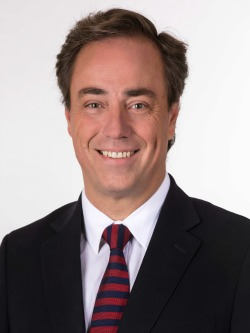

Member of the Chamber of Deputies
- In office 11 March 2018 – 11 March 2022
- Preceded by: Creation of the District
- Constituency: District 5

Personal details
- Born: 13 July 1967 (age 59) Santiago, Chile
- Party: National Renewal (RN)
- Education: Gabriela Mistral University
- Occupation: Politician
- Profession: Teacher

Francisco de Borja Eguiguren Correa (born 13 July 1967) is a Chilean Business Administrator and politician from the National Renewal party (RN). He was deputy for district No. 5 of the Coquimbo Region.

== Biography ==
Son of Gonzalo Alfonso Eguiguren Holdgson and María Consuelo Correa Saavedra. He has 6 children.

He completed his Basic and Secondary Education at the Tabancura School in Santiago. Later, he began to study law at the Gabriela Mistral University, finally graduating as a Business Administrator.

== Professional career ==
For 20 years he dedicated himself to developing his profession in the private sector. In 2000, he moved to La Serena to take over as Manager of the Líder Hypermarket.

== Political career ==
His political and public career began with his activism, in 1987, in the National Renewal (RN) party, at the time of its creation.

In 2005 he was a candidate for the Chamber of Deputies, in the ranks of the Independent Democratic Union (UDI) party, in the parliamentary elections of December 11 of that year, for the 7th District, obtaining 16,401 votes equivalent to 18.68% of the votes, without being elected.

In 2017, he again takes on the challenge of representing the Coquimbo Region in Parliament, this time running for the position of Deputy for District 5, which includes the communes of Andacollo, Canela, Combarbalá, Coquimbo, Illapel, La Higuera, La Serena, Los Vilos, Monte Patria, Ovalle, Paihuano, Punitaqui, Río Hurtado, Salamanca and Vicuña, in the Coquimbo Region, as a member of the National Renewal party, obtaining 11,144 votes, equivalent to 4.80% of the votes, and was elected.
