= Pichidangui =

Coordinates: 32°08′S 71°32′W

Pichidangui is a Chilean Pacific coastal town in the commune of Los Vilos in Choapa Province, Coquimbo Region, near the border with Valparaíso Region. The town has a significant amount of tourism due to its beaches. It is a popular destination for various windsports enthusiasts, thanks to the abundant wind in the area. The town is 197 kilometers north of the capital, Santiago. Some of the local area has been recommended to be added as a national conservation protected area.

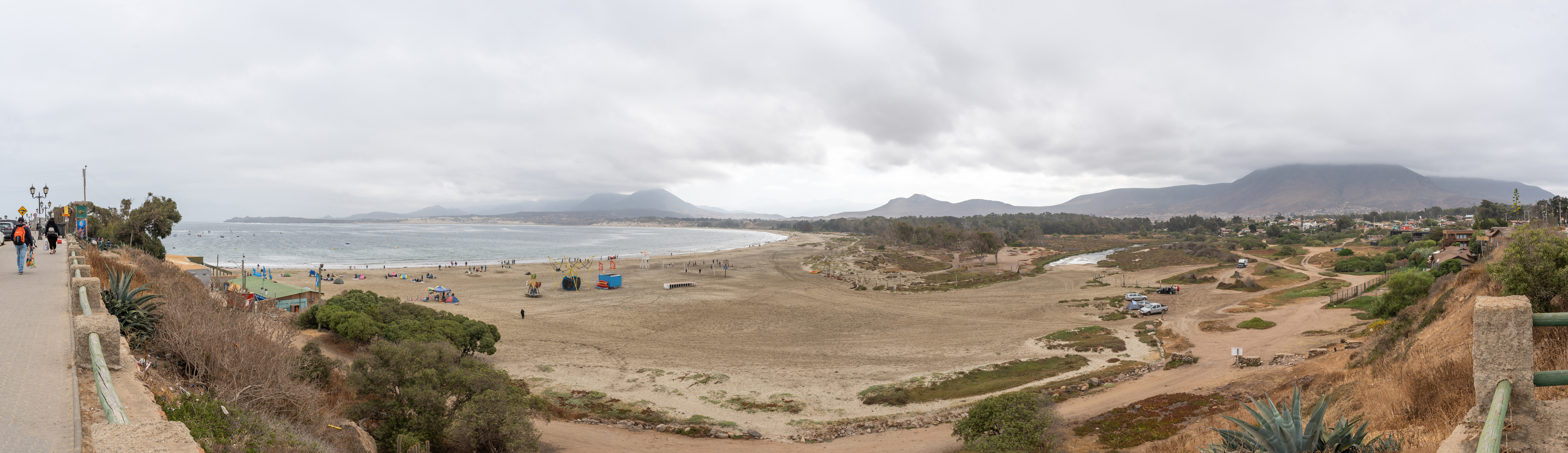
Panoramic view of Pichidangui

== See also ==
- List of towns in Chile
