= District 5 (Chamber of Deputies of Chile) =

Electoral district of the Chamber of Deputies of Chile

- Distrito 5
- Electoral District for the Chamber of Deputies
- Location of District 5 within Chile
- Region: Coquimbo
- Population: 757,586 (2017)
- Electorate: 623,580 (2021)
- Area: 40,588 km^{2} (2020)

Current Electoral District
- Created: 2017
- Seats: 7 (2017–present)
- Deputies: List: Nathalie Castillo (PC); Ricardo Cifuentes (PDC); Juan Fuenzalida (UDI); Daniel Manouchehri (PS); Víctor Alejandro Pino (DEM); Marco Antonio Sulantay (UDI); Carolina Tello (FA)

District 5 (Spanish: Distrito 5) is one of the 28 multi-member electoral districts of the Chamber of Deputies, the lower house of the National Congress, the national legislature of Chile. The district was created by the 2015 electoral reform and came into being at the following general election in 2017. It is conterminous with the region of Coquimbo. The district currently elects seven of the 155 members of the Chamber of Deputies using the open party-list proportional representation electoral system. At the 2021 general election the district had 623,580 registered electors.

== Electoral system ==
District 5 currently elects seven of the 155 members of the Chamber of Deputies using the open party-list proportional representation electoral system. Parties may form electoral pacts with each other to pool their votes and increase their chances of winning seats. However, the number of candidates nominated by an electoral pact may not exceed the maximum number of candidates that a single party may nominate. Seats are allocated using the D'Hondt method.

== Election results ==
=== Summary ===
Election	Apruebo Dignidad AD / FA			Green Ecologists PEV			Dignidad Ahora DA			New Social Pact NPS / NM			Democratic Convergence CD			Chile Vamos Podemos / Vamos			Party of the People PDG			Christian Social Front FSC		
Election	Votes	%	Seats	Votes	%	Seats	Votes	%	Seats	Votes	%	Seats	Votes	%	Seats	Votes	%	Seats	Votes	%	Seats	Votes	%	Seats
2021	49,571	20.93%	2	13,140	5.55%	0	9,979	4.21%	0	47,579	20.09%	2				54,927	23.19%	2	28,786	12.16%	1	18,227	7.70%	0
2017	21,665	9.34%	0							62,909	27.12%	2	36,402	15.69%	1	66,037	28.47%	3						

=== Detailed ===
==== 2021 ====
Results of the 2021 general election held on 21 November 2021:

Party		Pact	Party						Pact		
Party		Pact	Votes per province			Total votes	%	Seats	Votes	%	Seats
Party		Pact	Choapa	Elqui	Limarí	Total votes	%	Seats	Votes	%	Seats
Independent Democratic Union	UDI	Chile Podemos +	3,590	27,527	8,027	39,144	16.53%	2	54,927	23.19%	2
National Renewal	RN	Chile Podemos +	2,402	9,264	4,117	15,783	6.66%	0	54,927	23.19%	2
Communist Party of Chile	PC	Apruebo Dignidad	3,383	15,584	5,568	24,535	10.36%	2	49,571	20.93%	2
Social Convergence	CS	Apruebo Dignidad	1,616	7,324	2,677	11,617	4.91%	0	49,571	20.93%	2
Social Green Regionalist Federation	FREVS	Apruebo Dignidad	179	8,110	425	8,714	3.68%	0	49,571	20.93%	2
Comunes	COM	Apruebo Dignidad	262	3,821	622	4,705	1.99%	0	49,571	20.93%	2
Christian Democratic Party	PDC	New Social Pact	1,826	16,736	3,515	22,077	9.32%	1	47,579	20.09%	2
Socialist Party of Chile	PS	New Social Pact	825	11,649	2,554	15,028	6.35%	1	47,579	20.09%	2
Party for Democracy	PPD	New Social Pact	4,831	2,074	915	7,820	3.30%	0	47,579	20.09%	2
Radical Party of Chile	PR	New Social Pact	267	1,485	902	2,654	1.12%	0	47,579	20.09%	2
Party of the People	PDG		3,715	17,060	8,011	28,786	12.16%	1	28,786	12.16%	1
Republican Party	REP	Christian Social Front	1,605	12,772	3,850	18,227	7.70%	0	18,227	7.70%	0
Green Ecologist Party	PEV		1,669	8,474	2,997	13,140	5.55%	0	13,140	5.55%	0
United Centre	CU	United Independents	1,211	7,288	2,151	10,650	4.50%	0	10,650	4.50%	0
Equality Party	IGUAL	Dignidad Ahora	694	4,417	1,487	6,598	2.79%	0	9,979	4.21%	0
Humanist Party	PH	Dignidad Ahora	471	1,537	1,373	3,381	1.43%	0	9,979	4.21%	0
Progressive Party	PRO		444	2,536	982	3,962	1.67%	0	3,962	1.67%	0
Valid votes			28,990	157,658	50,173	236,821	100.00%	7	236,821	100.00%	7
Blank votes			3,186	8,474	5,286	16,946	6.36%				
Rejected votes – other			1,681	8,110	3,059	12,850	4.82%				
Total polled			33,857	174,242	58,518	266,617	42.76%				
Registered electors			79,469	395,399	148,712	623,580					
Turnout			42.60%	44.07%	39.35%	42.76%					

The following candidates were elected: Nathalie Castillo (PC), 12,304 votes; Ricardo Cifuentes (PDC), 11,439 votes; Juan Fuenzalida (UDI), 9,220 votes; Daniel Manouchehri (PS), 12,292 votes; Víctor Alejandro Pino (PDG), 9,275 votes; Marco Antonio Sulantay (UDI), 18,248 votes; and Carolina Tello (PC), 12,231 votes.

==== 2017 ====
Results of the 2017 general election held on 19 November 2017:

Party		Pact	Party						Pact		
Party		Pact	Votes per province			Total votes	%	Seats	Votes	%	Seats
Party		Pact	Choapa	Elqui	Limarí	Total votes	%	Seats	Votes	%	Seats
Independent Democratic Union	UDI	Chile Vamos	1,732	28,059	7,484	37,275	16.07%	2	66,037	28.47%	3
National Renewal	RN	Chile Vamos	1,789	19,775	7,198	28,762	12.40%	1	66,037	28.47%	3
Socialist Party of Chile	PS	Nueva Mayoría	6,899	11,176	3,471	21,546	9.29%	1	62,909	27.12%	2
Communist Party of Chile	PC	Nueva Mayoría	2,104	9,515	5,576	17,195	7.41%	1	62,909	27.12%	2
Social Democrat Radical Party	PRSD	Nueva Mayoría	836	10,577	3,960	15,373	6.63%	0	62,909	27.12%	2
Party for Democracy	PPD	Nueva Mayoría	953	1,929	5,913	8,795	3.79%	0	62,909	27.12%	2
Christian Democratic Party	PDC	Democratic Convergence	7,978	18,725	9,699	36,402	15.69%	1	36,402	15.69%	1
Social Green Regionalist Federation	FREVS	Green Regionalist Coalition	691	22,055	1,646	24,392	10.52%	1	24,392	10.52%	1
Democratic Revolution	RD	Broad Front	846	10,163	3,141	14,150	6.10%	0	21,665	9.34%	0
Equality Party	IGUAL	Broad Front	346	2,776	663	3,785	1.63%	0	21,665	9.34%	0
Green Ecologist Party	PEV	Broad Front	211	2,155	460	2,826	1.22%	0	21,665	9.34%	0
Humanist Party	PH	Broad Front	106	609	189	904	0.39%	0	21,665	9.34%	0
Amplitude	AMP	Sumemos	4,900	6,950	2,006	13,856	5.97%	0	13,856	5.97%	0
Andrea Guzman Herrera (Independent)	Ind		436	3,896	1,170	5,502	2.37%	0	5,502	2.37%	0
Progressive Party	PRO	All Over Chile	123	769	291	1,183	0.51%	0	1,183	0.51%	0
Valid votes			29,950	149,129	52,867	231,946	100.00%	7	231,946	100.00%	7
Blank votes			2,297	7,967	4,342	14,606	5.68%				
Rejected votes – other			1,222	6,927	2,277	10,426	4.06%				
Total polled			33,469	164,023	59,486	256,978	44.51%				
Registered electors			75,405	359,189	142,727	577,321					
Turnout			44.39%	45.66%	41.68%	44.51%					

The following candidates were elected: Francisco Eguiguren (RN), 11,132 votes; Juan Fuenzalida (UDI), 4,331 votes; Sergio Gahona (UDI), 27,332 votes; Daniel Núñez (PC), 15,300 votes; Raúl Saldívar (PS), 11,077 votes; Pedro Velásquez (FREVS), 22,587 votes; and Matías Walker (PDC), 15,468 votes.
