= Ricardo Cifuentes =

Chilean politician (born 1962)

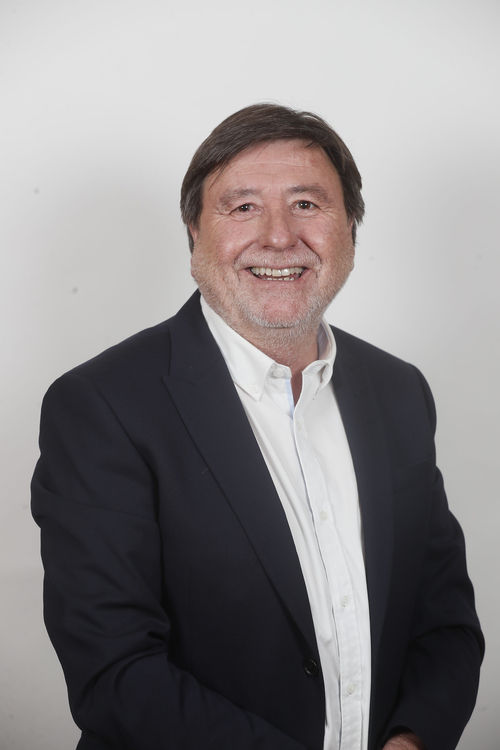
- Cifuentes in 2022

President of the Chamber of Deputies
- In office 24 July 2023 – 15 April 2024
- Preceded by: Vlado Mirosevic
- Succeeded by: Karol Cariola

Member of the Chamber of Deputies
- In office 11 March 2022 – 11 March 2026
- Preceded by: District created
- Constituency: District 5

Undersecretary of Regional and Administrative Development
- In office 11 March 2014 – 11 March 2018
- President: Michelle Bachelet
- Preceded by: Miguel Flores Vargas
- Succeeded by: Felipe Salaberry

Personal details
- Born: 12 September 1962 (age 63) San Javier, Chile
- Party: Christian Democratic Party
- Education: University of La Serena
- Occupation: Politician, historian

Ricardo Óscar Cifuentes Lillo (born 12 September 1962, in San Javier de Loncomilla) is a Chilean professor and politician.

He was undersecretary of Regional and Administrative Development of Chile from 2014 to 2018. He served as president of the Chamber of Deputies from 24 July 2023 to 15 April 2024.

== Biography ==
His parents are Juan Isidro Cifuentes and Margarita del Carmen Lillo Fuentealba. He has five brothers, two of them pursued a political career. Hugo Enrique (Superintendent of Social Security between 1992 and 1994) and Eugenia de Las Marías (Management Advisor of the Gabriel González Videla Municipal Corporation of La Serena).

He completed his secondary education at the Gregorio Cordovez High School. He has a degree in History and Geography from the University of La Serena and has a diploma in Political Science.

Ricardo Cifuentes is the brother-in-law of the mayor of Vicuña, Rafael Vera Castillo.

His daughter, Andrea Cifuentes Vergara, a psychologist by profession. She has held positions in the Municipality of La Serena, currently she is regional secretary of the National Clean Production Council.

== Career ==
In 1993, he joined the Planning Seremia of the Coquimbo Region as part of the cabinet of Mayor Renán Fuentealba, a position he held until 2000.

In 2001, he participated in the parliamentary elections as a candidate for Deputy for District No. 7, which groups the communes of Andacollo, La Higuera, La Serena, Paihuano and Vicuñano, but was not elected.

That same year he was appointed director of the company ESSCO (Health Services Company of the Coquimbo Region), the board of directors was chaired by former mayor Renán Fuentealba Moena. He remained in office until 2005, when the company was granted a 30-year concession to Aguas del Valle.

In 2005, he participated again in the parliamentary elections as a candidate for Deputy for District No. 7, which groups the communes of Andacollo, La Higuera, La Serena, Paihuano and Vicuña, but was not elected.

In 2006, he was appointed by President Michelle Bachelet as Mayor of the Coquimbo Region between 11 March 2006, and 11 March 2010, the date on which he handed over the position to Sergio Gahona.

In 2010, he was appointed Vice Chancellor of the Pedro de Valdivia University (UPV), La Serena headquarters, until 2013, when he resigned when the establishment was investigated for problems with its accreditation.

On 28 January 2014, he was appointed Undersecretary of Regional Development by President-elect Michelle Bachelet. He took office on 11 March of that year and resigned in March 2018.

In September 2018, he was appointed director of National Television of Chile, a position with a duration of eight years.
