= Las Brujas Airport =

Las Brujas Airport may refer to:

- Las Brujas Airport (Chile), serving Salamanca
- Las Brujas Airport (Colombia) serving Corozal
- Las Brujas Airport (Cuba) serving Las Brujas
