= Gahona =

Gahona is a Chilean surname. Notable people with the surname include:

- Ángel Eduardo Gahona, (1976–2016), Nicaraguan journalist
- Gabriel Vicente Gahona, (1828–1899), Mexican painter
- Sergio Gahona, (born 1965), Chilean Senator
