= Salamanca, Chile =

Salamanca
- City and Commune
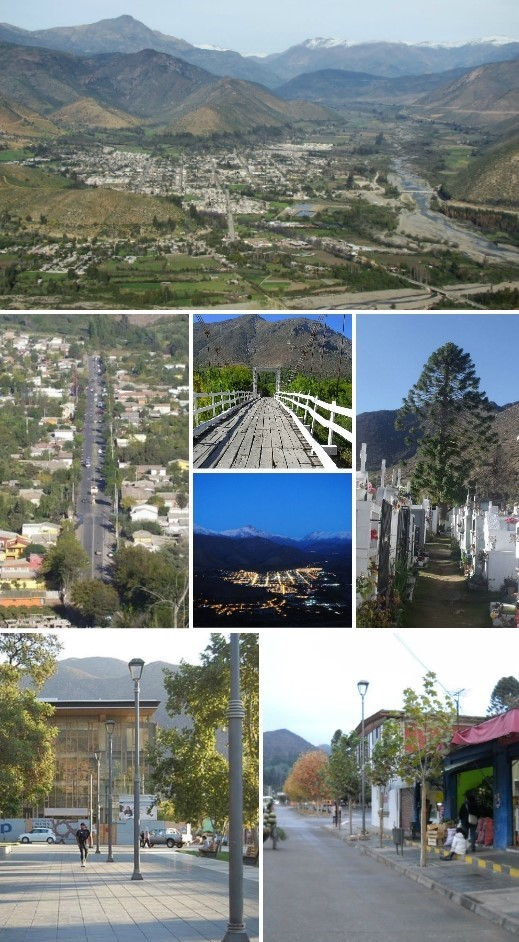

- Flag Coat of arms Map of Salamanca in the Coquimbo Region Location in Chile
- Coordinates: 31°46′S 70°58′W
- Country: Chile
- Region: Coquimbo
- Province: Choapa
- Established: 1844
- Founder: Joaquín de Ceballo

Government
  - Type: Municipality
  - Alcalde: Gerardo Rojas Escudero (PPD)

Area
  - Total: 3,445.3 km^{2} (1,330.2 sq mi)
- Elevation: 632 m (2,073 ft)

Population (2012 Census)
  - Total: 25,326
  - Density: 7.3509/km^{2} (19.039/sq mi)
  - Urban: 12,689
  - Rural: 11,805

Sex
  - Men: 13,043
  - Women: 11,451
- Time zone: UTC−4 (CLT)
  - Summer (DST): UTC−3 (CLST)
- Area code: 56 + 53
- Website: Municipality of Salamanca

Salamanca is a Chilean city and commune in Choapa Province, Coquimbo Region. It is located 30 km (19 mi) east of Illapel, the province's administrative center, and 316 km (196 mi) north of Santiago, Chile. It is normally accessed from Los Vilos, which lies next to the Panamerican Highway, and connects the city to the rest of the country.

Salamanca sits on the north bank of the Choapa River and within the Choapa valley. It was officially founded in 1844 by Joaquín de Ceballo, governor of Illapel.

It is served by Las Brujas Airport.

== History ==
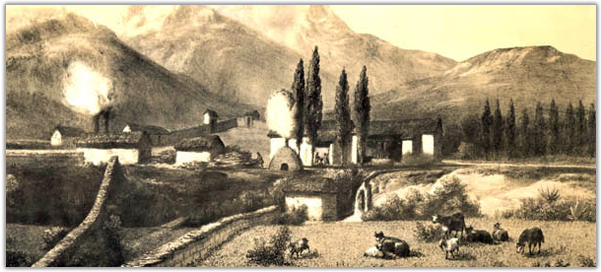
Historical Review

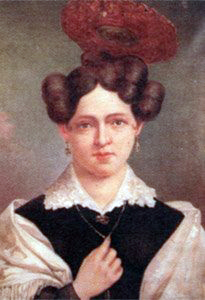
Matilde Salamanca

The city of Salamanca was founded on November 29, 1844, by the Acting Governor of Illapel Joaquin Ceballos, By resolution of the Board of Hospitals Santiago, in the grounds of the Hacienda Choapa, at that time owned by the charity. The estate was owned by Matilde Salamanca, whose property by testamentary disposition became initially administered by the Church (1820) and then by decree of the Supreme Director Bernardo O'Higgins, Dated September 1, 1821, delivered to the public welfare. It was located on the north bank of the Choapa river, Next to an ancient Indian seat which formed part of the "Commit Choapa" And stood at the place now known as Chalinga. By 1897 Salamanca already had 2,000 inhabitants, while Chalinga 367 recorded documents that date, which is described as a small village whose plant comprises 48 blocks divided by straight streets "regular width." Church already had, Telegraph Office and Civil Registration and Municipality seat constituted with jurisdiction over subdivisions in Peralillo Cerro Chico and Salamanca.

Of the many farms that were part of the Choapa Making, some were parceled under the Homestead Act of 1928. however, in 1959 when the Agrarian Reform Corporation does not acquire the National Health Service (legal successor of the Public Welfare), the estates that formed the Hacienda Choapa, they still amounted to 253,000 has, Of which. Just over 8,000 acres were irrigated.

In the late sixties as a result of the CORA program, a program of concentration of rural population Choapa Valley holds in villages that are located on both banks of the river of the same name, setting urban areas in 1982.

== Early inhabitants ==
Its area has a long human occupation since the last glaciation. After finally succeeding 10,000 years ago these human groups have come parajes. Also, this town is known to be considered in previous years as a city witch, faithfully represented by autochthonous people like Jose Maria Olguin, of which several stories are told.

=== Early occupation ===
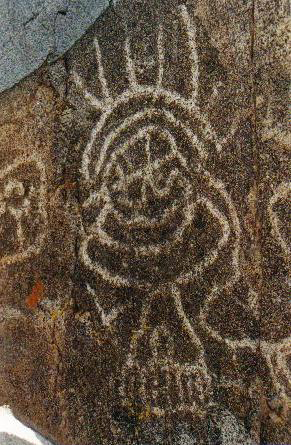
Historical culture of the valley

Between 8000 and 2500 BC, walking these bands of hunter-gatherer land, which are transferred from the coast in search of food. Gradually accessing these groups will develop an incipient agriculture (especially corn) associated with hunting guanacos.

Between 300 BC and 200, burst into the valley agroalfareras populations originating in northwestern Argentina. Precisely these are from the first archaeological evidence of our past, as evidenced by the findings of St. Augustine, Grove, Chillepín, Panguesillo and Salamanca.

=== Molle culture ===
These people, of uncertain origin, lived in valleys and gorges, relying on agriculture and livestock. They had simple knowledge of gold, silver, and copper metallurgy. They make simple pottery, knew the use of snuff or the like in the region and introduce a lip ornament made of stone: the tembetá. Limited data on this culture for concluding that development in the area was marginal.

=== Diaguita culture ===
Theoretically it is believed that diaguitas came to Chile to the tenth century from Argentine northwest, across the mountains and valleys populating North Chico. The entities diaguitas tribes in the valley preferably devoted to hunting, agriculture and breeding, forming a pattern of semi-villager or villager settlement. The diaguitas developed a rich pottery finally decorated with geometric motifs, which evolved technically to the arrival of the Incas. Their political organization was characterized as constituted " dual lordships ," i.e., the manors were divided into two installments, each governed by a chief lord. One half corresponded to the coast, the other part to the mountains or "top " of the valley where the valley diaguitas Choapa domains were located. Although the authors can not specify, or petroglyphs marked stones of the valley tend to be associated with diaguita. These stones and boulders covered with signs and drawings, are something of a precursor of writing, a way of perpetuating certain facts or data. Characteristics are petroglyphs Panguesillo, Chillepín, Jorquera, Santa Rosa, Cerro Chico and Salamanca.

=== Inca rule ===
The ruler Tupac Inca Yupanqui (1471-1493) is credited with the conquest of the south extending their domains Tahuantisuyo in Diaguita territory. The expedition was prepared under the leadership of General Sinchiruca, with over ten thousand soldiers who fought for six years between Copiapo and Aconcagua. Some argue that the Inca domination lasted 50 to 75 years until the arrival of the Spaniards.

The Inca invasion left across the region Choapa its civilizing footprint, managing to introduce a more rational exploitation on crops, taught the construction of roads and irrigation canals, as likewise the production of textiles, pottery and various household utensils. After the Inca invasion of Chile, of the Cordilleran area Petorca spent the Inca Trail in central Chile. The same was followed by Diego de Almagro (1536) and Pedro de Valdivia (1540) to enter the Aconcagua Valley and the Valley of the Mapocho River. Is interesting to note the existence of vestiges of "this Inca road" route built to transport military, trade and communications to maintain Incanato. This road was part of a network of twenty thousand kilometers paths between mountains and valleys. Since much remains are known in the valleys and Alicahue Petorca. In 1984 a section up to Cuncumén and Conchuca the dairy farm (dairy farms were places of rest and replenishment) was discovered. There are precedents for the existence of a coastal Inca Trail (still unknown), it must have passed through La Serena, Illapel and Ligua.

== Demographics ==
According to the 2002 census of the National Statistics Institute, Salamanca spans an area of 3,445.3 km^{2} (1,330 sq mi) and has 24,494 inhabitants (13,043 men and 11,451 women). Of these, 12,689 (51.8%) lived in urban areas and 11,805 (48.2%) in rural areas. The population grew by 5.9% (1,368 persons) between the 1992 and 2002 censuses.

== Administration ==
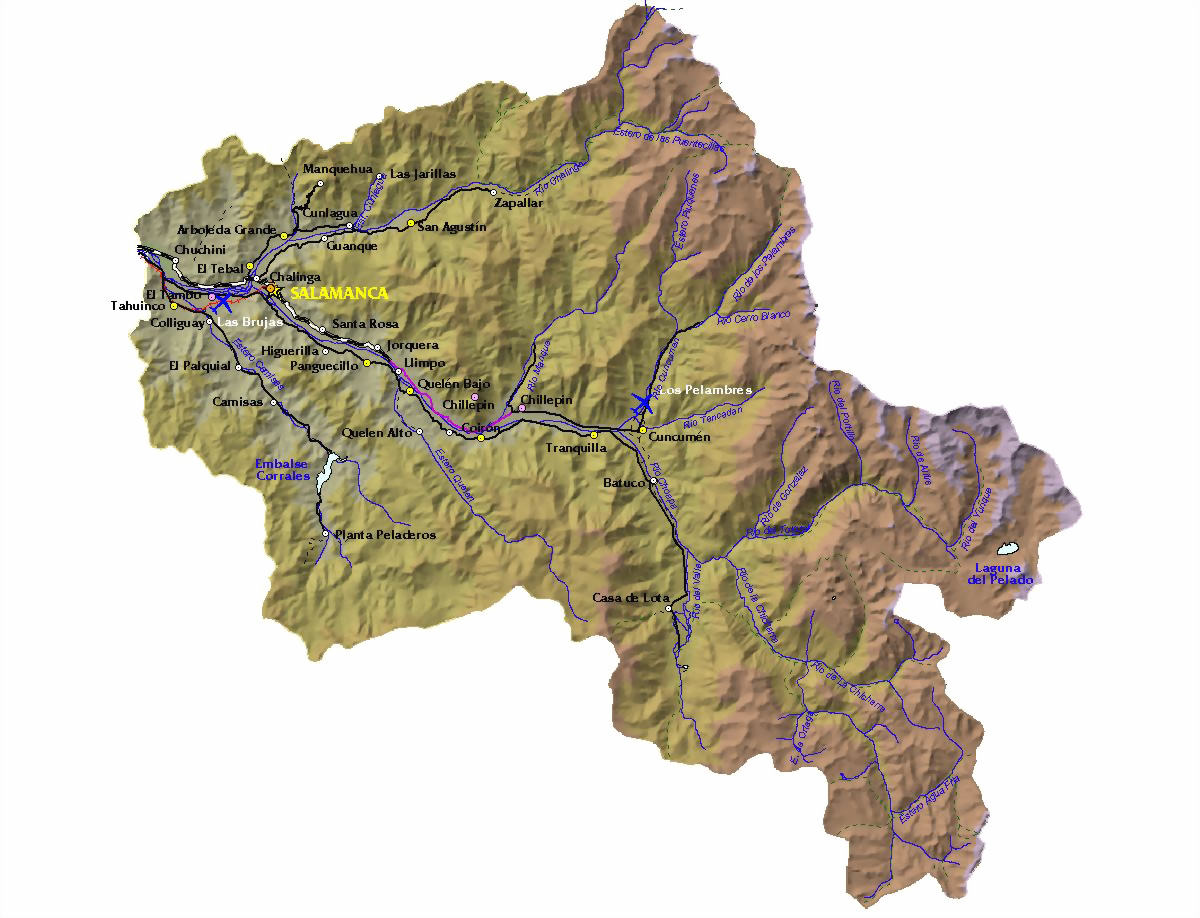
Map of commune of Salamanca, Chile.

As a commune, Salamanca is a third-level administrative division of Chile administered by a municipal council, headed by an alcalde who is directly elected every four years. The 2008-2012 alcalde is Gerardo Rojas Escudero (PPD). The council has the following members:

- Pedro Chávez González
- Roberto Rondanelli Hidalgo
- Rubén Sacre Barlaro
- Omar Alamos Calderón
- Carlos Rojas Tapia
- Enrique Tapia

Within the electoral divisions of Chile, Salamanca is represented in the Chamber of Deputies by Adriana Muñoz (PDC) and Luis Lemus (Ind.) as part of the 9th electoral district, (together with Combarbalá, Punitaqui, Monte Patria, Illapel, Los Vilos, Canela). The commune is represented in the Senate by Evelyn Matthei Fornet (UDI) and Jorge Pizarro Soto (PDC) as part of the 4th senatorial constituency (Coquimbo Region).

== Panorama ==
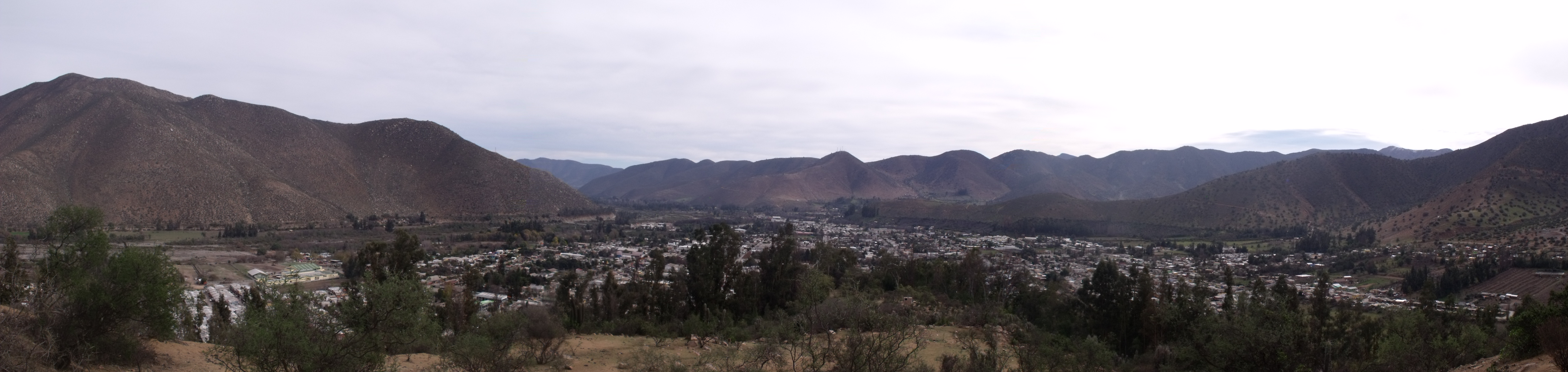

== Municipal Cemetery Salamanca ==
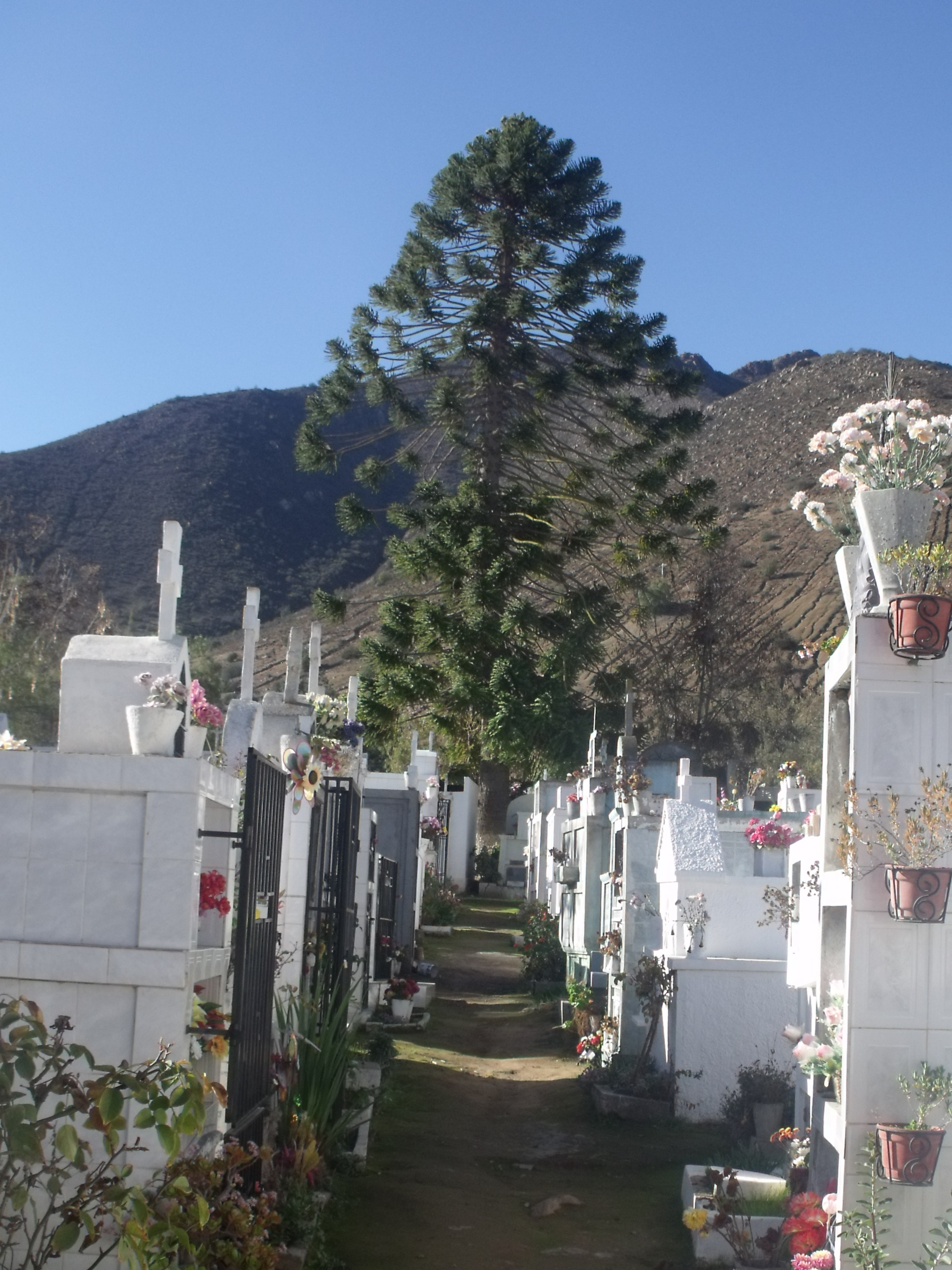
Municipal Cemetery Salamanca

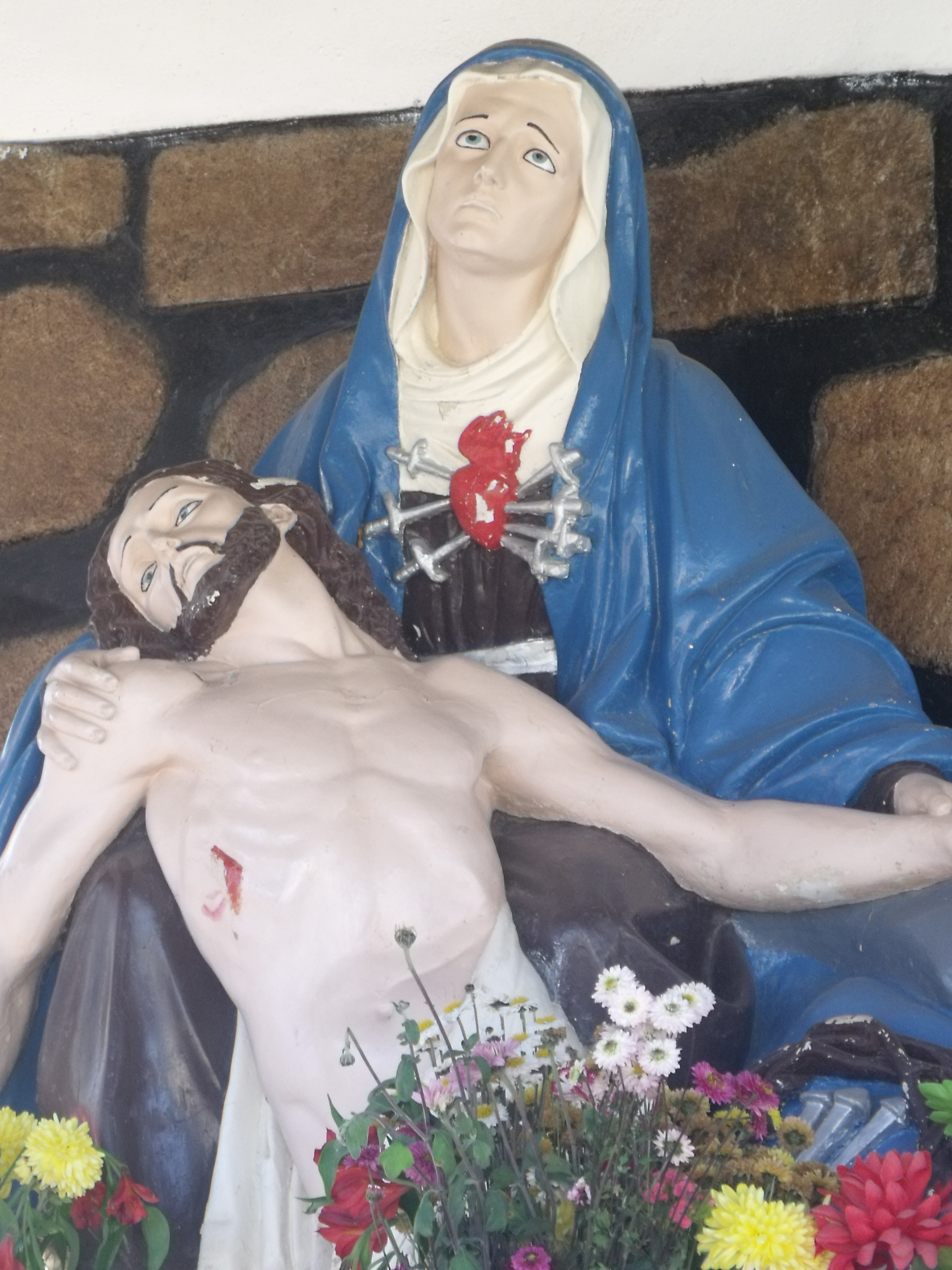
The statue of Jesus and Mary

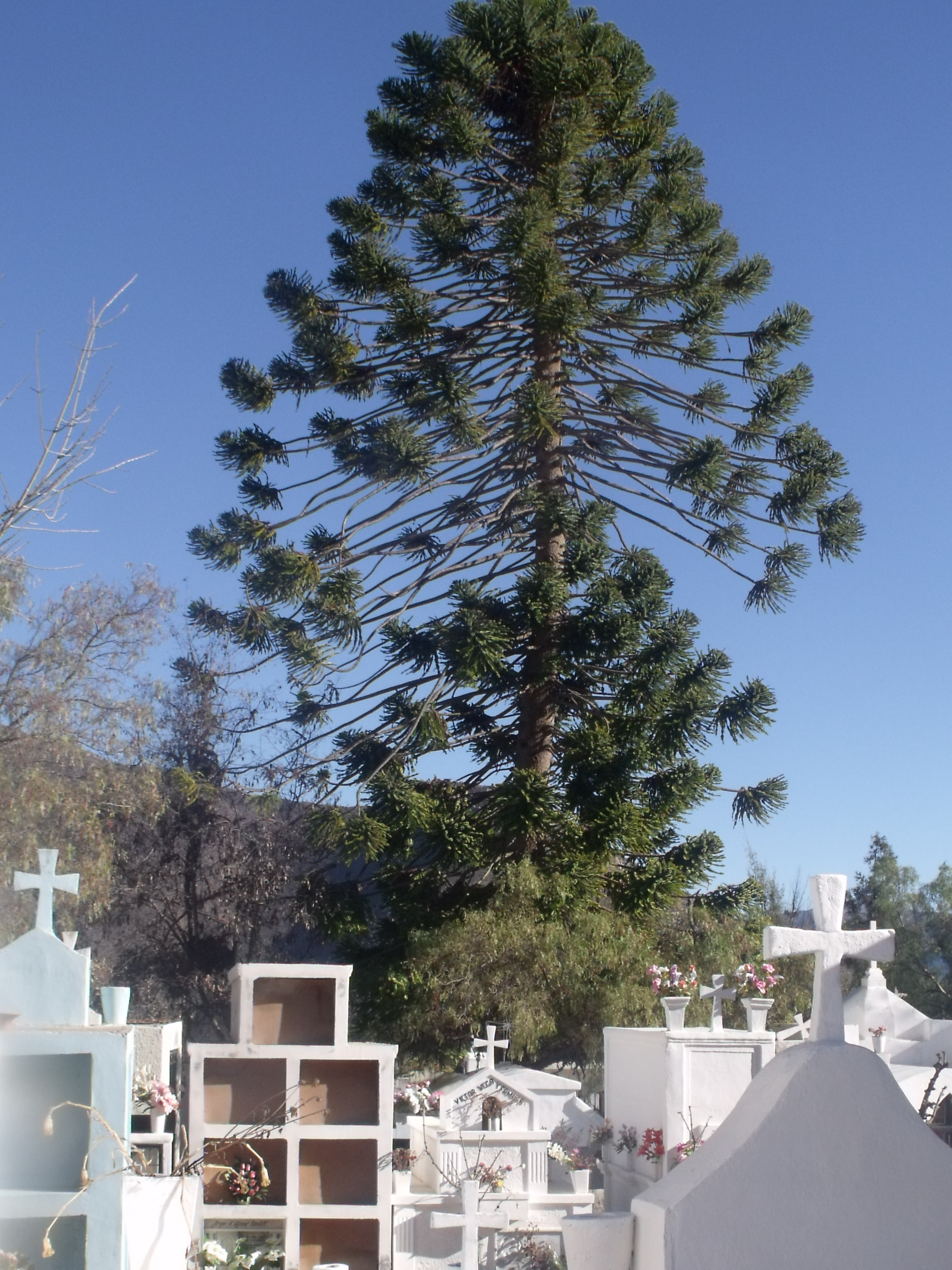

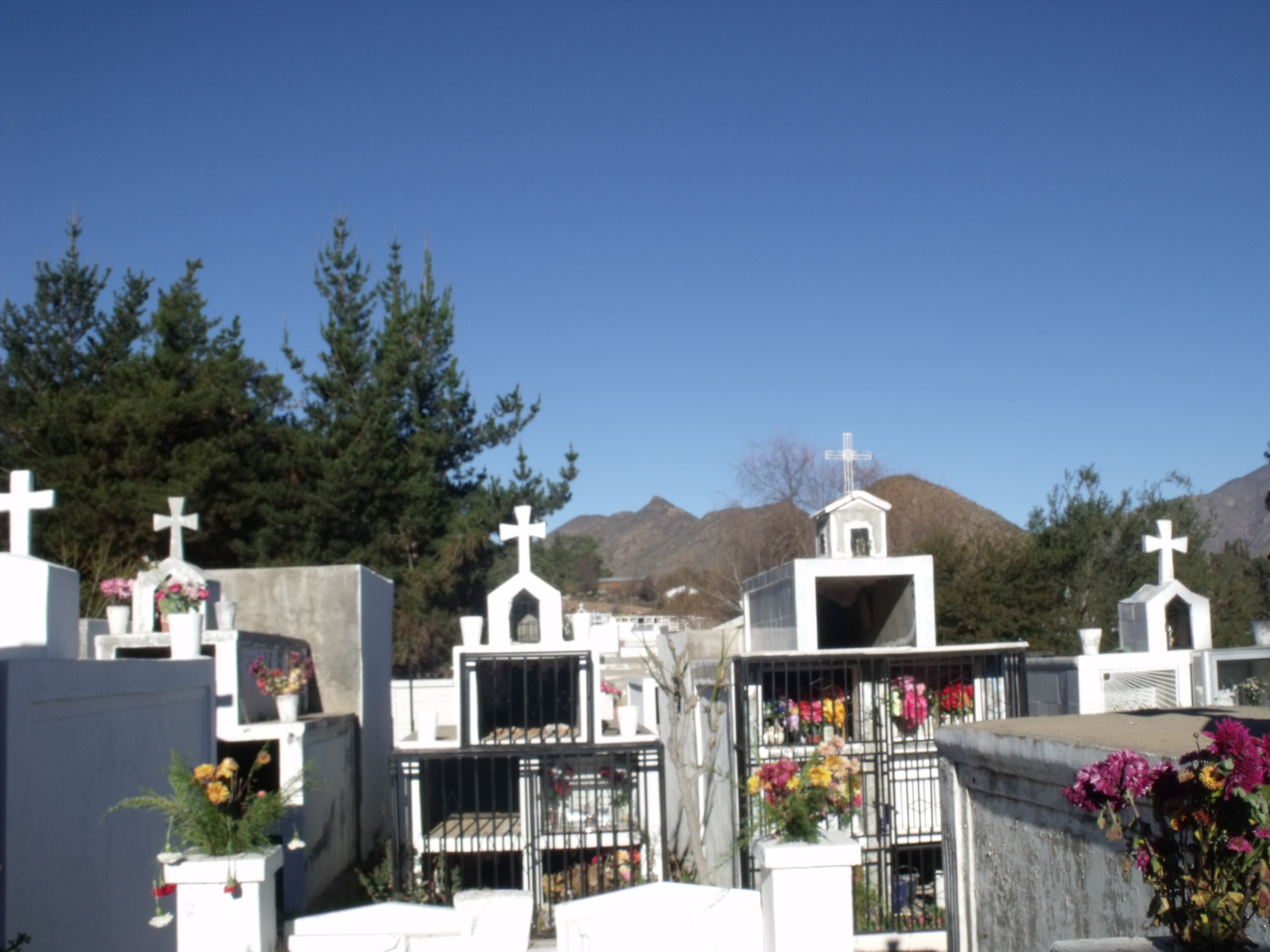
Municipal Cemetery Salamanca (Right)

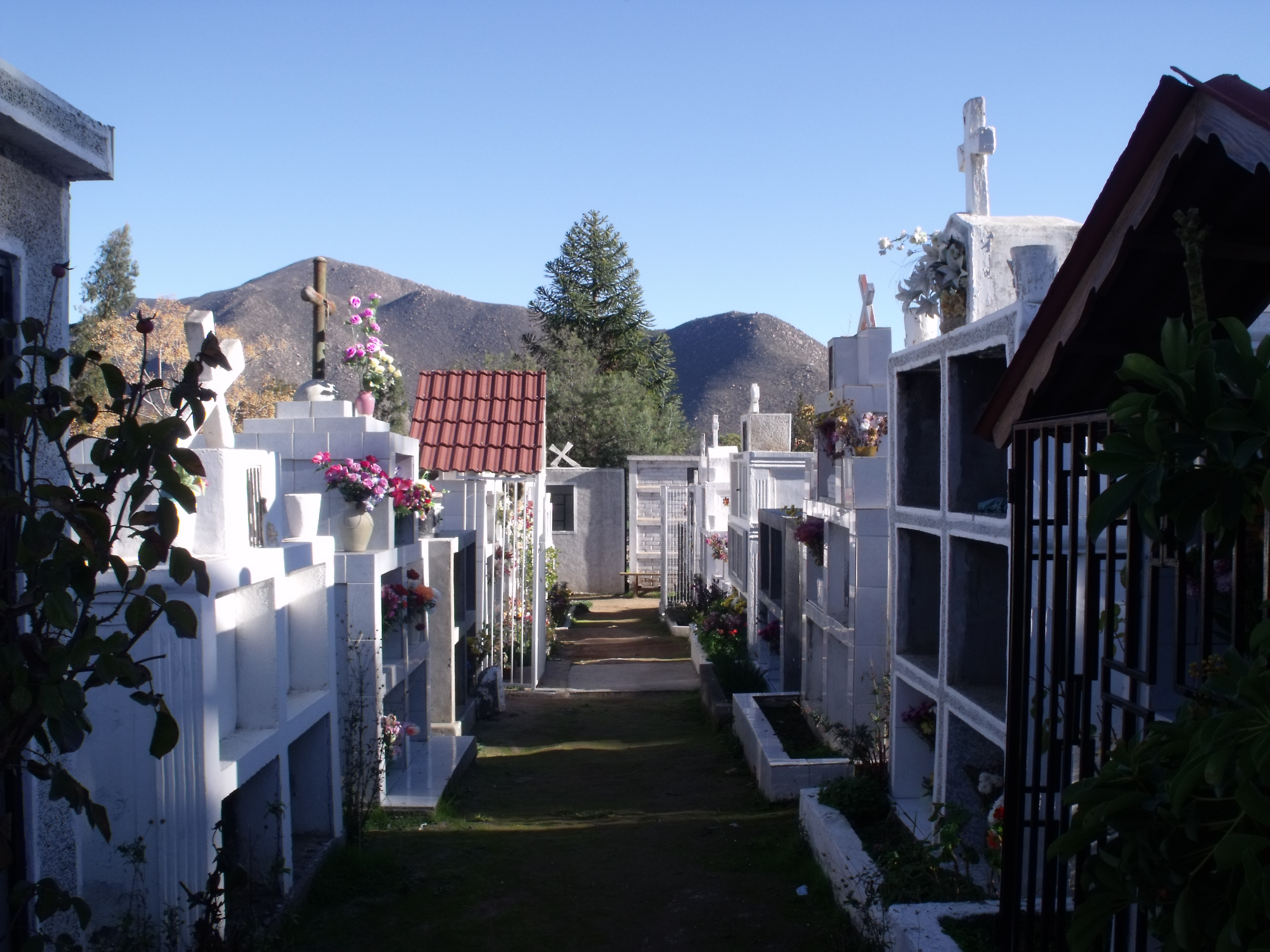

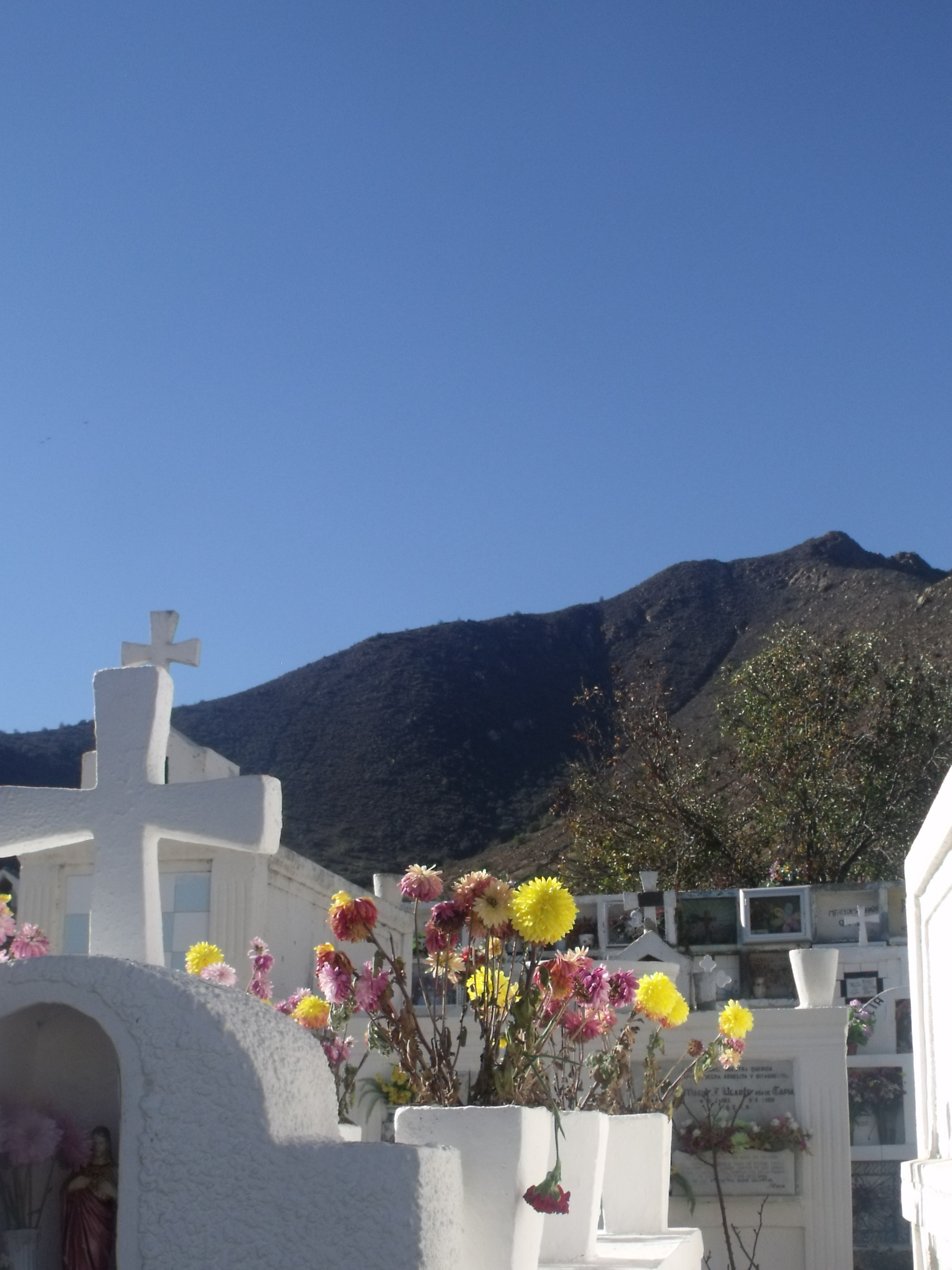

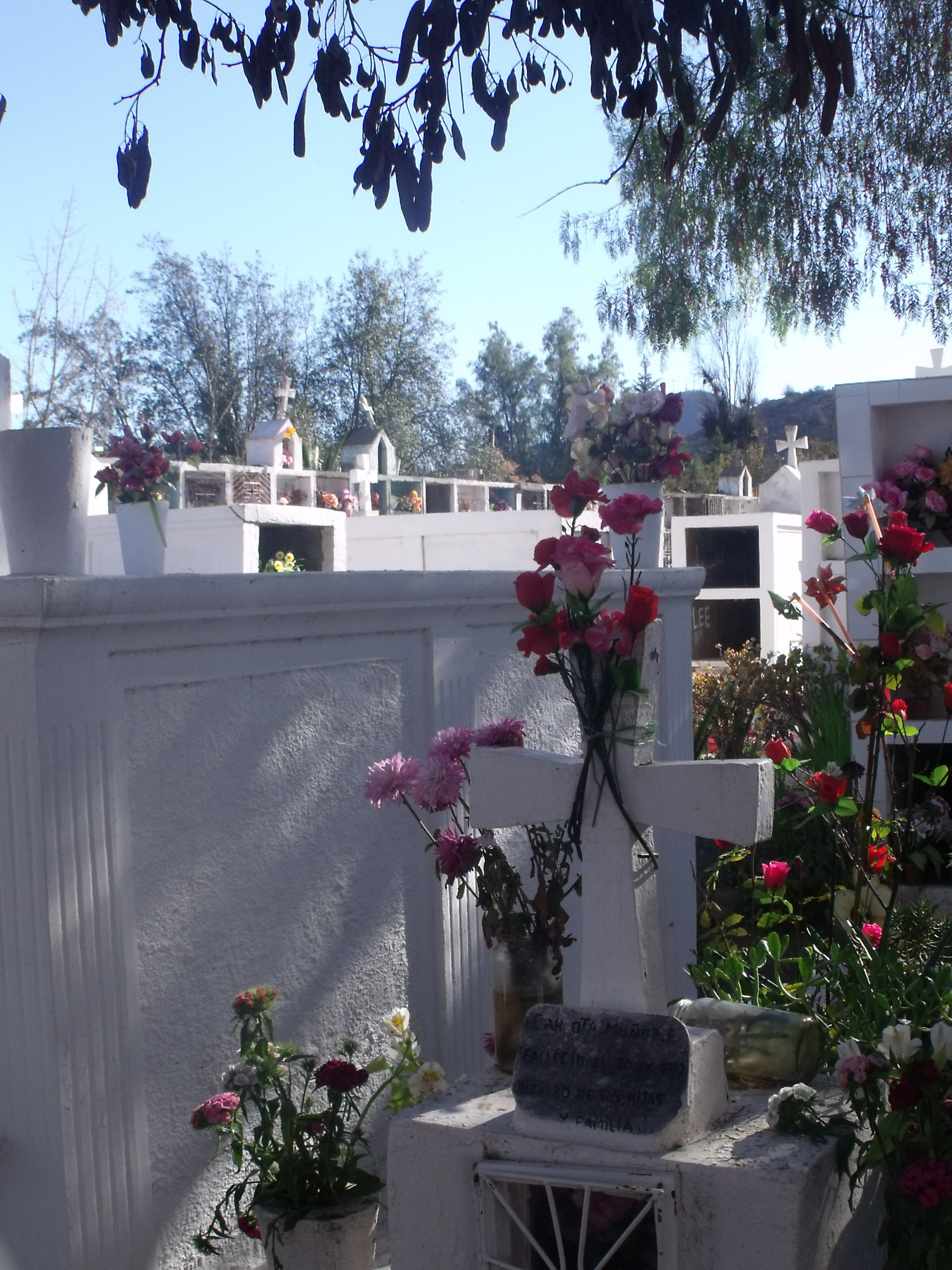

== Gallery ==
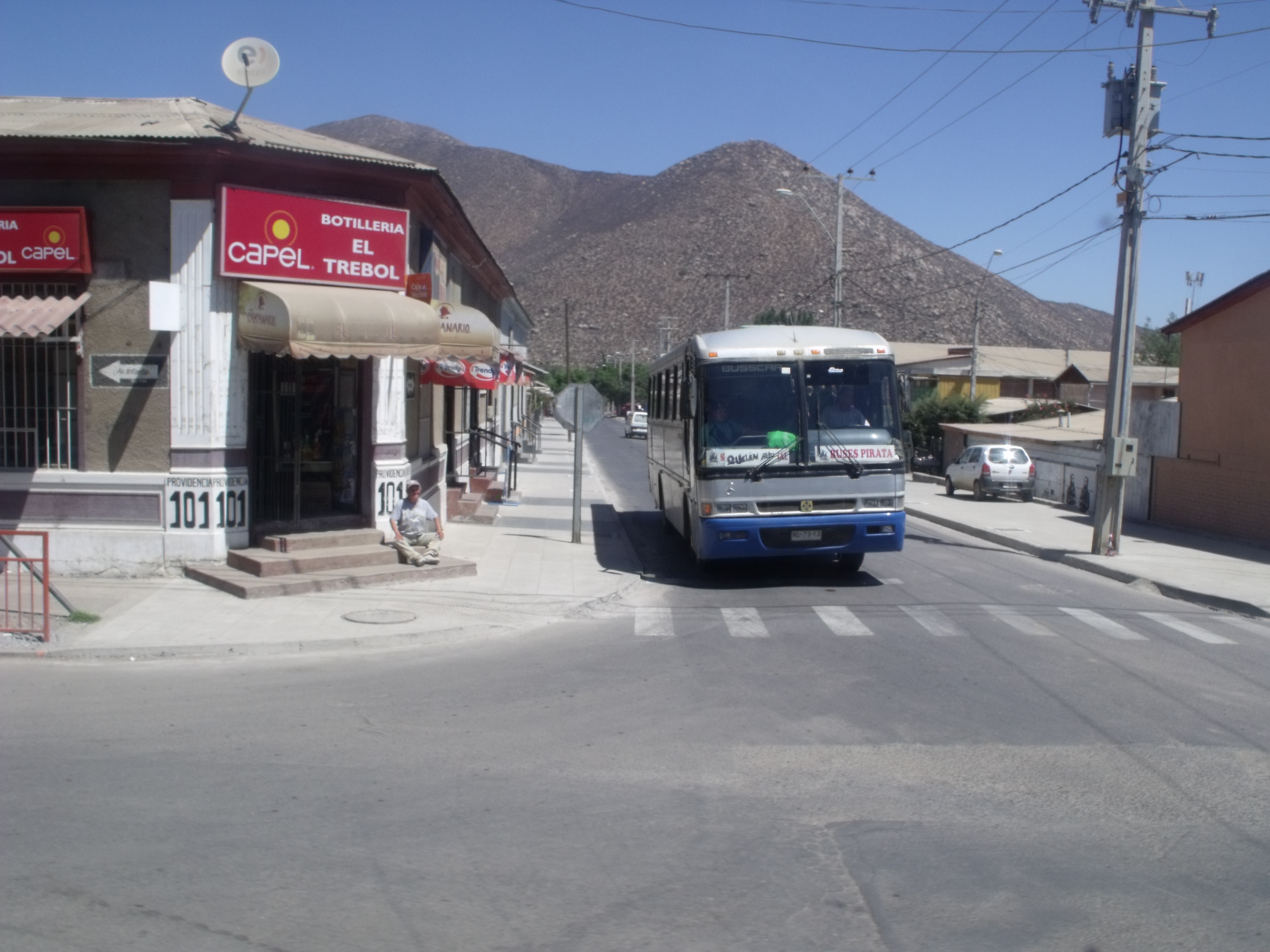

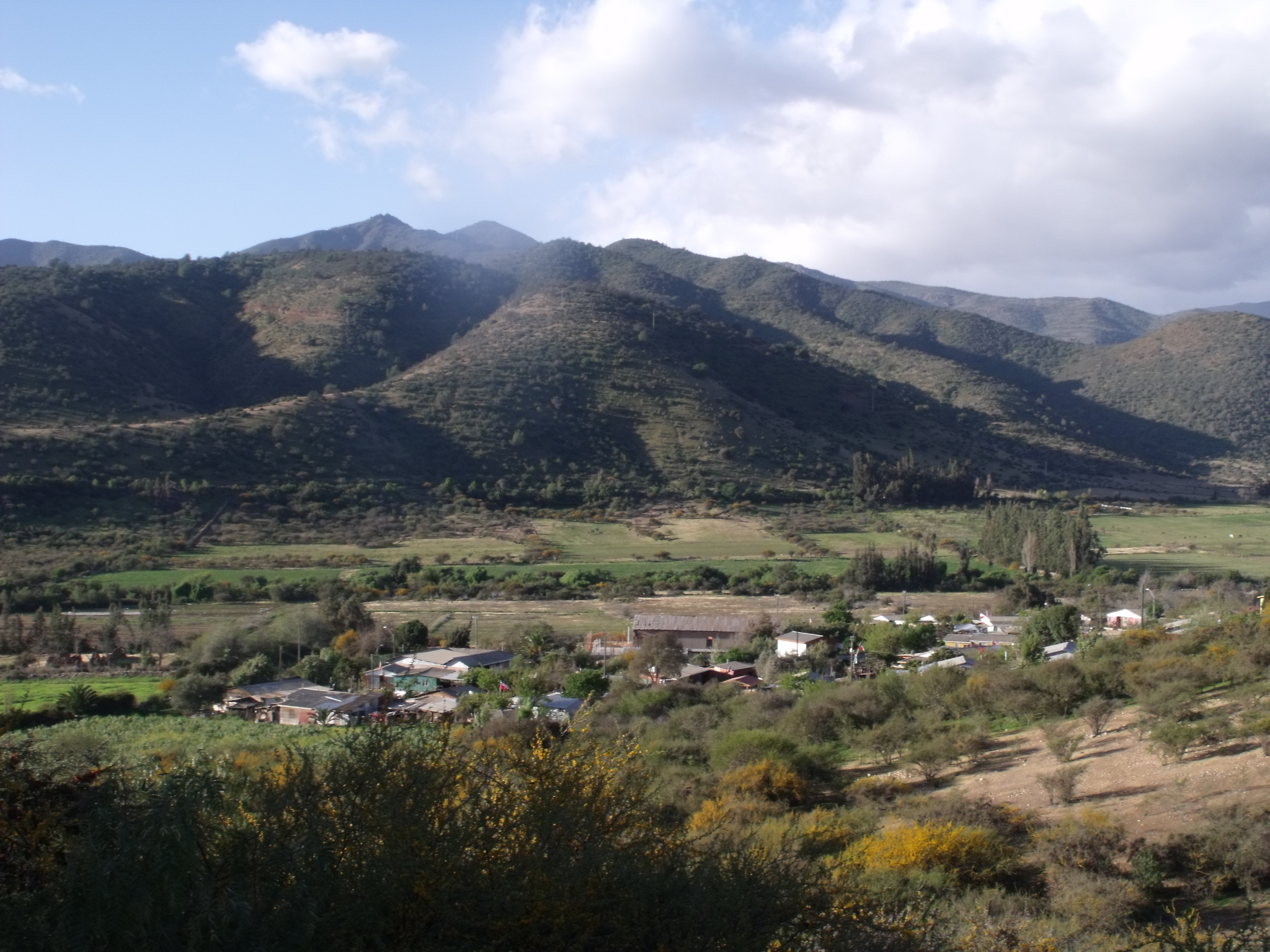
The village of Chuchiñi

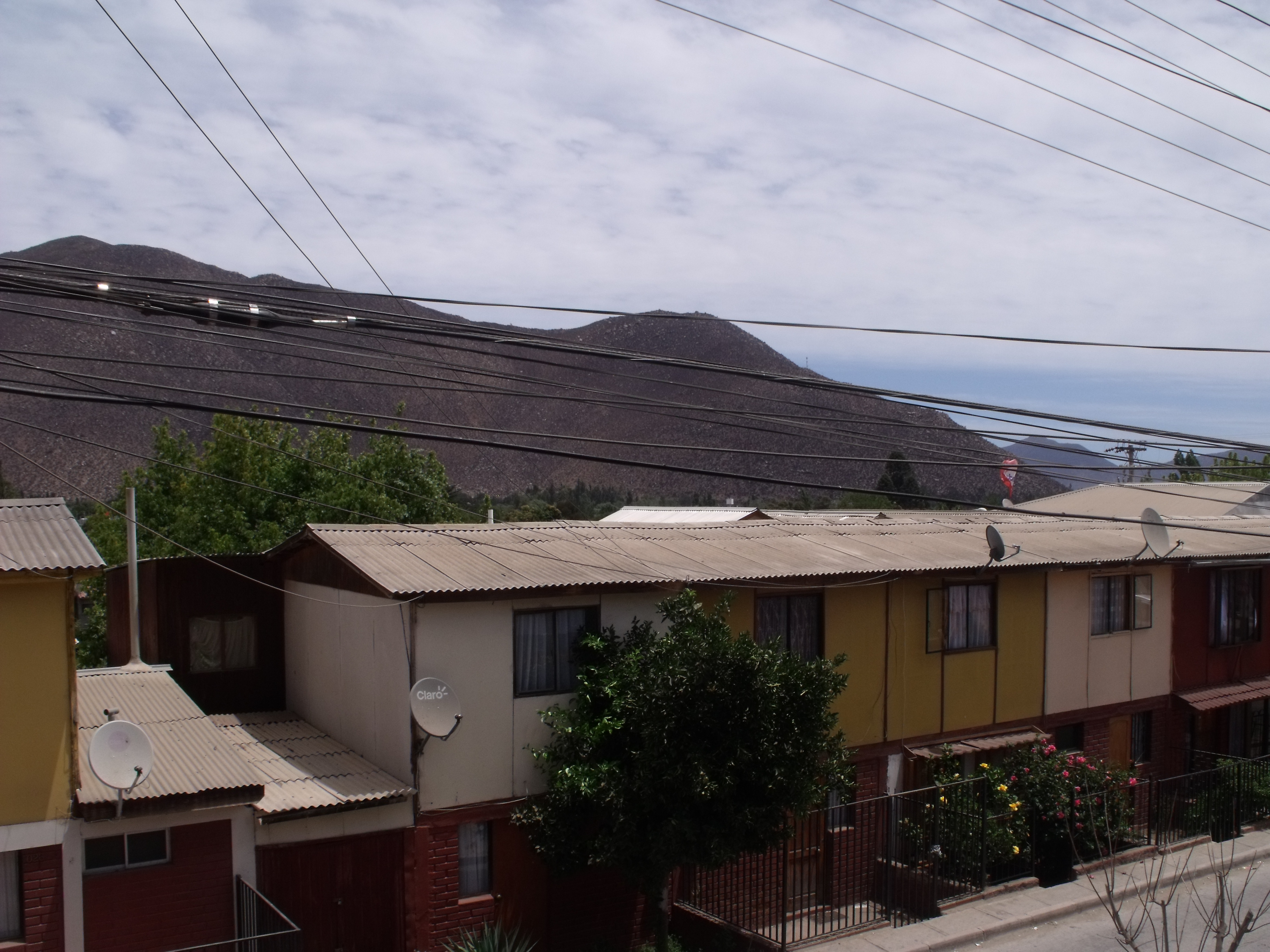
Neighborhoods in Salamanca

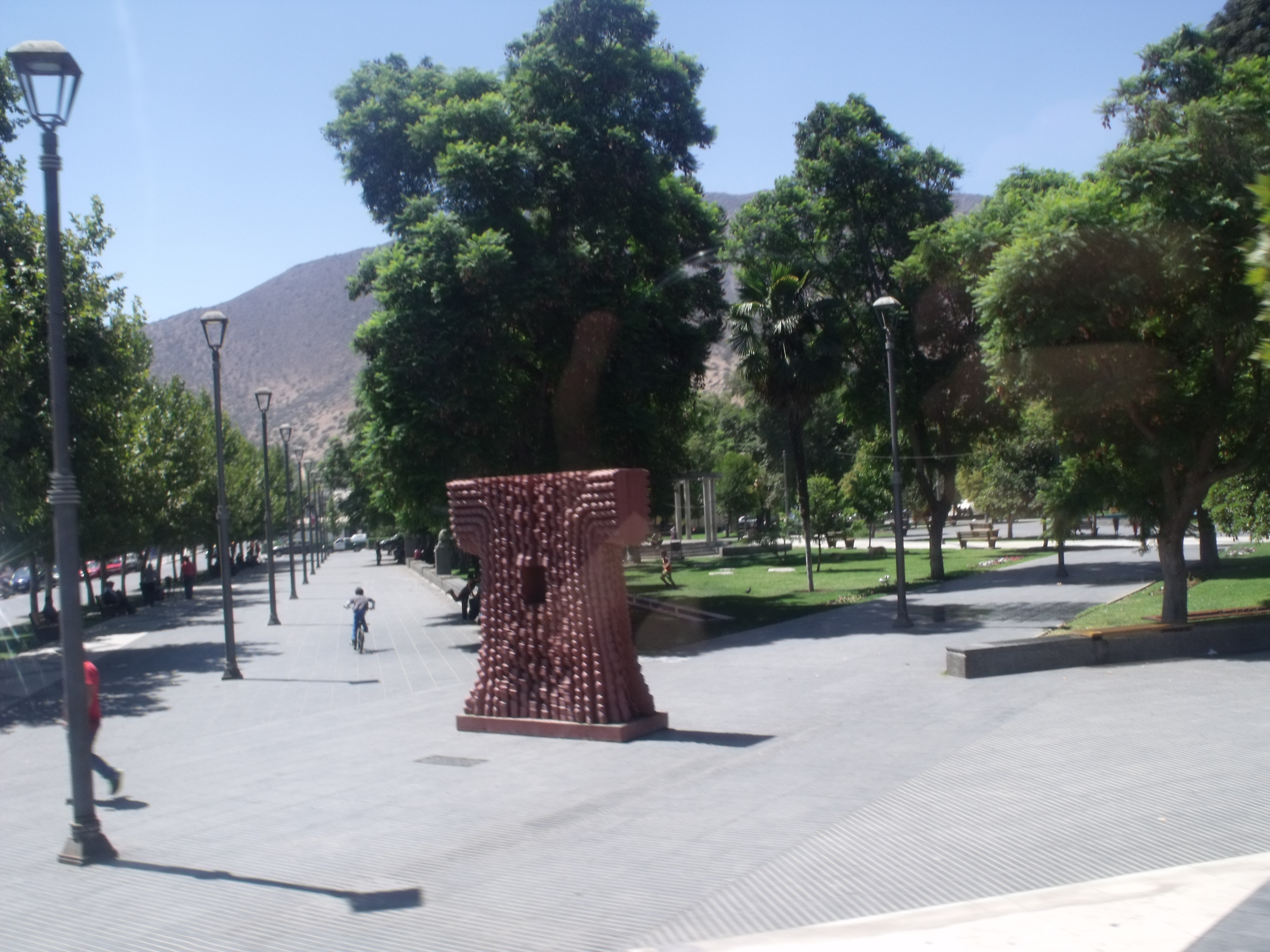
Plaza de Aguirre
