= Las Chinchillas National Reserve =

Chilean national reserve

- IUCN category IV (habitat/species management area)
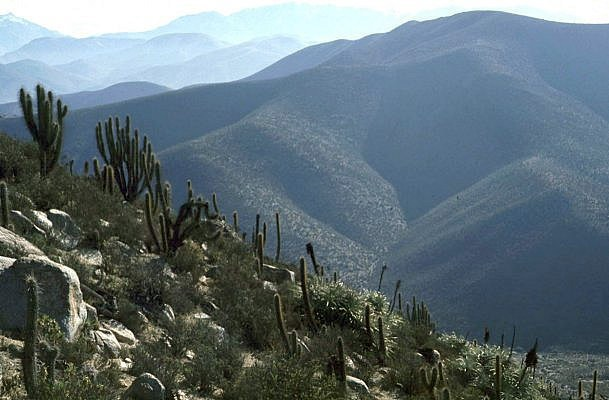
- Chinchilla Habitat
- Interactive map of Las Chinchillas National Reserve
- Location: Coquimbo Region, Chile
- Nearest city: Illapel
- Coordinates: 31.6306°S 71.1653°W
- Area: 42.29 km^{2} (16.33 sq mi)
- Designation: National reserve
- Designated: 1984
- Governing body: Corporación Nacional Forestal (CONAF)

Las Chinchillas National Reserve is a national reserve located in the Choapa Province, Coquimbo Region, Chile. The reserve gives shelter to some of the few remaining colonies of long-tailed chinchillas in the wild.

== Biology ==
In addition to the chinchillas, other small mammals (mainly rodents), two fox species and felines like the Puma inhabit the reserve and surrounding hills. Actually only about half of the wild chinchillas are located within the reserve boundaries. The other half live on private and communally owned lands.

The reserve is home to a number of species of birds, including the Chilean mockingbird, Chilean tinamou, long-tailed meadowlark, moustached turca and Harris's hawk. Owl species inhabiting the park include the burrowing owl, austral pygmy-owl and great horned owl. The Andean condor can also be seen in the area.
