= Alí Manouchehri =

Chilean footballer (born 1986)

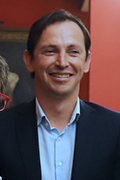

Mayor of Coquimbo
- Incumbent
- Assumed office 28 July 2021
- Preceded by: Marcelo Pereira

Personal details
- Party: None
Association football career
- Date of birth: 2 August 1986 (age 40)
- Place of birth: Vienna, Austria
- Height: 1.79 m (5 ft 10 in)
- Positions: Centre-back; full-back
Youth career
- Los Piratas
- 2002–2004: Coquimbo Unido
Senior career*
| Years | Team | Apps | (Gls) |
| 2003–2009 | Coquimbo Unido | 62 | (3) |
| 2007 | → Levante B (loan) | 0 | (0) |
| 2008 | → Deportes Antofagasta (loan) | 19 | (0) |
| 2008 | → O'Higgins (loan) | 0 | (0) |
| 2010 | Santiago Morning | 2 | (0) |
| 2010–2011 | Ñublense | 21 | (1) |
| 2012 | Deportes Concepción | 24 | (0) |
| 2013–2014 | Coquimbo Unido | 15 | (0) |
| 2015–2016 | Unión San Felipe | 18 | (0) |
| 2016 | Boyacá Chicó | 10 | (1) |
| 2017 | Caudal | 0 | (0) |
| 2017 | Deportes Pintana | 12 | (0) |
| 2018 | Coquimbo Unido | 2 | (0) |
| Total | | 185 | (5) |
International career
| 2006 | Chile U23 | 1 | (0) |
- * Club domestic league appearances and goals

Alí Manuel Manouchehri Moghadam Kashan Lobos (Persian: علی مانوئل منوچهری مقدم کاشان لوبوس; born 2 August 1986), known as Alí Manouchehri, is a Chilean former professional footballer who played as a centre-back and full-back, and a politician. He has served as mayor of Coquimbo since 2021.

== Early life ==
Manouchehri was born in Austria to an Iranian father, who died four months before his birth, and a Chilean mother, María Lobos Inzunza. He moved to Coquimbo at the age of six.

== Club career ==
As a child, Manouchehri trained with the Los Piratas academy. He later joined the youth system of Coquimbo Unido and made his professional debut in 2003 at the age of 17. In 2015, he was runner-up in the Chilean Primera División with the club. He was a key figure in Coquimbo Unido's historic campaign, scoring a last-minute winning goal against Everton in the 97th minute.

In 2007, Manouchehri played for Levante UD B in Spain. He returned to Chile in 2008, joining Deportes Antofagasta and later that year, O'Higgins, both in the top division.

He went on to play for Coquimbo Unido (2009), Santiago Morning (2010), and Ñublense (2011), all in the Chilean Primera División. In 2012, he joined Deportes Concepción, where he earned the nickname "El León Manouchehri" ("The Lion Manouchehri") from fans.

Between 2013 and 2014, he returned to Coquimbo Unido, helping the club win the 2014 Clausura tournament in Primera B. He later played for Unión San Felipe (2015–2016) and Boyacá Chicó FC in Colombia's top division in 2016.

Manouchehri was called up to both the Chile U23 and senior national teams. He was also recognized as the best defender at the FIFPro international tournament held in Mexico. In addition to his playing career, he studied to become a professional coach, which complemented his role as a central defender.

== International career ==
By birth and descent, Manouchehri was eligible to represent Austria, Iran, and Chile. He chose to represent Chile, the country where he has spent most of his life, and played at the under-23 level.

== Political career ==
Manouchehri entered municipal politics in northern Chile in 2021 as an independent candidate for mayor of Coquimbo. He ran against the local incumbent sector, which had been linked to corruption cases and low public confidence. His campaign emphasized transparency and political independence. He was elected with over 30% of the vote.

Upon taking office in July 2021, the municipality faced a debt of more than CLP $40 billion, reduced public services, and limited institutional capacity. Manouchehri introduced a financial recovery plan, administrative reforms, and a set of infrastructure and social programs. According to municipal data, the debt was reduced by over 80% in less than three years.

During his first term, the administration implemented initiatives related to public safety, urban infrastructure, housing, and citizen outreach. In the 2024 municipal elections, Manouchehri was re-elected with 64% of the vote and over 90,000 ballots cast, the highest mayoral vote total recorded in the Coquimbo Region.

== Personal life ==
Manouchehri comes from a politically active family. His relatives left Chile before his birth due to the military dictatorship. His older brother, Daniel Manouchehri, has served as a member of the Chamber of Deputies of Chile since 2022.

Ali and his brother were primarily raised by their maternal aunt, Marta Lobos, and her husband, Francisco Encina, both of whom were involved in politics. Through his aunt, he is also a cousin of Viviana Encina, a journalist and television presenter.

== Honours ==
=== Player ===
Coquimbo Unido

- Primera B de Chile (2): 2014 Clausura, 2018

=== Individual ===
- SIFUP Recognition for Post-Retirement Career: 2025
