= Las Brujas Airport (Chile) =

Las Brujas Airport Aeropuerto Las Brujas
- IATA: none; ICAO: SCXB

Summary
- Airport type: Public
- Serves: Salamanca, Chile
- Elevation AMSL: 1,483 ft / 452 m
- Coordinates: 31°47′10″S 71°0′45″W

Map
- Location of Las Brujas Airport in Chile

Runways
Direction	Length		Surface
Direction	m	ft	Surface
09/27	800	2,625	Grass
- Source: Landings.com Google Maps GCM

Las Brujas Airport (Spanish: Aeropuerto Las Brujas, (ICAO: SCXB)) is an airport serving Salamanca, a town in the Coquimbo Region of Chile.

The airport is 4 kilometres (2.5 mi) west of Salamanca, along the banks of the Choapa River. There is mountainous terrain in all quadrants.

== See also ==
- Transport in Chile
- List of airports in Chile
