= Ricardo Hormazábal =

Chilean politician

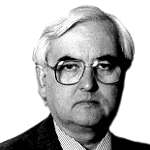

Ambassador of Chile to Germany
- In office March 1998 – May 2000
- Appointed by: Eduardo Frei Ruíz-Tagle
- President: Eduardo Frei Ruíz-Tagle; Ricardo Lagos
- Preceded by: Roberto Cifuentes Allel
- Succeeded by: Antonio Skármeta

Member of the Senate of Chile
- In office 11 March 1990 – 11 March 1998
- Preceded by: District created
- Succeeded by: Jorge Pizarro
- Constituency: 4th Circumscription

Member of the Chamber of Deputies
- In office 15 May 1973 – 21 September 1973
- Succeeded by: Dissolution of the Office

Personal details
- Born: 7 July 1946 (age 80) Santiago, Chile
- Party: Christian Democratic Party
- Spouse: María Eugenia Gómez
- Children: Three
- Parent(s): Concepción Sánchez; Luis Hormazábal
- Education: University of Chile (LL.B)
- Occupation: Politician
- Profession: Lawyer

Luis Ricardo Hormazábal Sánchez (born 7 July 1946) is a Chilean politician who served as a deputy, senator and ambassador.

== Biography ==
=== Family and youth ===
He was born in Santiago on 7 July 1946. He is the son of Luis Hormazábal Hernández and Concepción Sánchez Díaz. He married María Eugenia Gómez Arceu and is the father of three daughters: Marcela, Claudia, and Magdalena.

=== Education and professional career ===
He completed his secondary education at Valentín Letelier High School and Miguel Luis Amunátegui High School in Santiago. He later entered the Faculty of Law of the University of Chile, where he earned a degree in Legal and Social Sciences. His graduation thesis was entitled Financial corporations, and he qualified as a lawyer on 29 December 1970.

Between 1970 and 1973, he worked as a legal clerk for the State Bank of Chile. In 1975, he traveled to the Federal Republic of Germany, where he undertook postgraduate studies at the Institute of Political Science and International Relations of the University of Bonn. He also completed a diploma in European Union–Chile Relations at Miguel de Cervantes University in cooperation with the Complutense University of Madrid.

In his professional career, he worked as a lawyer at Banco del Desarrollo, where he founded and later chaired the company’s trade union for eight years. In the academic field, from 2001 onward, he served as an adjunct professor at the Institute of Public Affairs of the University of Chile. He also taught Ethics and Government and Public International Law at the Metropolitan Technological University (UTEM), and was a professor in the Department of Government and Public Management of the Institute of Public Affairs (INAP) at the University of Chile. He conducted research on parliamentary oversight of government and administrative actions at the University of Chile.

=== Political career ===
He began his political career after being elected national president of Chilean secondary students and as a leader of the Federation of Students of the University of Chile (FECh).

He joined the Christian Democratic Party of Chile in 1961, at the age of 14. In 1969, he became first vice-president of the party’s youth wing and later served as its president in 1971. In 1979, he assumed the role of party councillor. In 1987, he ran for the presidency of the party but was not elected. In 2000, he ran again and won the internal elections, serving as party president from May 2000 until July 2001, when he resigned.

In 1977, he returned to Chile, where he organized some of the first public protests against the military government of General Augusto Pinochet, resulting in his detention on several occasions. He also collaborated with the Vicariate of Solidarity. Until 1989, he served as president of the Confederation of Banking Trade Unions of Chile and founded and chaired the Banco del Desarrollo employees’ union for eight years.

In the 1989 parliamentary elections, following the victory of the “No” option in the 1988 plebiscite, he ran for the Senate of Chile representing the Christian Democratic Party within the Concertación coalition, for the Fourth Senatorial District (Coquimbo Region), for the 1990–1998 term. He was elected with the highest vote share in the district, obtaining 88,360 votes, equivalent to 36.85% of valid votes cast.

In 1997, he was replaced as candidate in the Fourth Senatorial District by fellow party member Jorge Pizarro Soto. In the 2005 parliamentary elections, he ran for the Chamber of Deputies of Chile for District No. 22 in the Metropolitan Region of Santiago, but was not elected. In 2009, he again ran for a seat in the Chamber of Deputies for District No. 2 in the Tarapacá Region, also without success.

Between 1998 and 2000, he served as Ambassador of Chile to Germany during the government of President Eduardo Frei Ruiz-Tagle. In the elections held on 8 January 2017, he was a candidate for the presidency of the Christian Democratic Party.
