= Renán Fuentealba Moena =

Chilean politician (1917–2021)

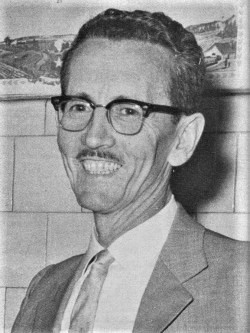
Fuentealba in 1964

Tulio Renán Fuentealba Moena (19 April 1917 – 1 October 2021) was a Chilean politician who was deputy of Chile from 1957 to 1965, president of the Christian Democratic Party from 1961 to 1965 and again from 1972 to 1973 and senator of the senator from 1965 to 1973.

== Biography ==
Renan Fuentealba Moena was born in Talcahuano, Chile to Octavio Fuentealba and Rosa Orfelina Moena on April 19, 1917. He was educated at a secondary school in Tomé and Seminar in Concepción. He entered the University of Concepcion and Pontifical Catholic University of Chile, graduating as a lawyer and was sworn on April 28, 1943 with a thesis entitled "Obrero Stockholder," known in English as "Stockholder Worker."
