= Canela, Chile =

Canela
- Commune
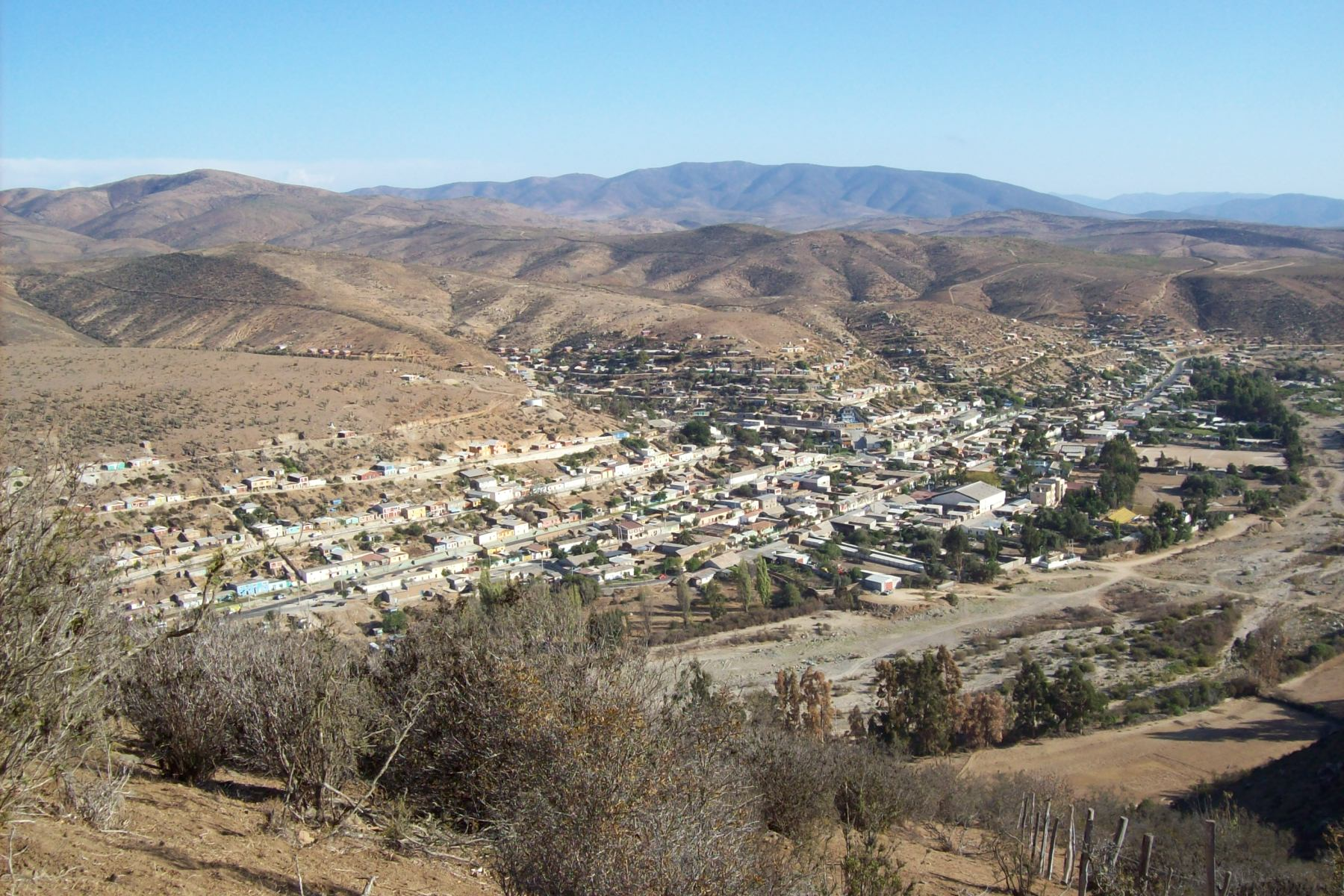
- Canela Baja

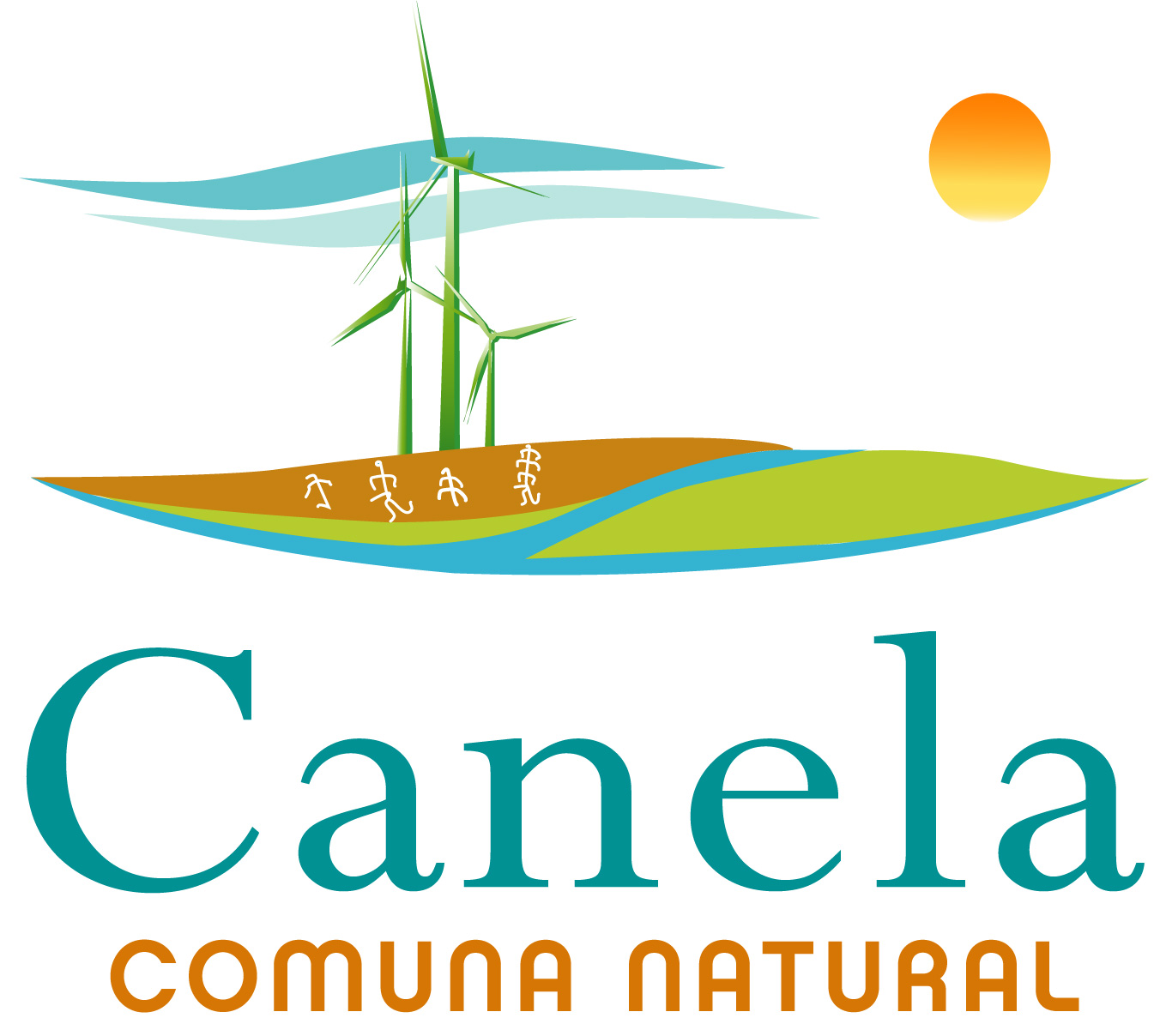
- Flag Coat of arms Location in Chile
- Coordinates (city): 31°23′56″S 71°27′22″W
- Country: Chile
- Region: Coquimbo
- Province: Choapa
- Established: 1891
- Named for: Quechua: sun sparkling
- Capital: Canela Baja

Government
  - Type: Municipality
  - Alcalde: Juan Bernardo Leyton Lemus

Area
  - Total: 2,196.6 km^{2} (848.1 sq mi)
- Elevation: 295 m (968 ft)

Population (2012 Census)
  - Total: 9,182
  - Density: 4.180/km^{2} (10.83/sq mi)
  - Urban: 1,744
  - Rural: 7,635
- Demonym: Canelino/a

Sex
  - Men: 4,737
  - Women: 4,642
- Time zone: UTC-4 (CLT)
  - Summer (DST): UTC-3 (CLST)
- Area code: 56 + 53
- Website: www.canela.cl

Canela is one of four communes in the Choapa Province of Chile's north-central IV Coquimbo Region. The capital is the town of Canela Baja.

== Administration ==
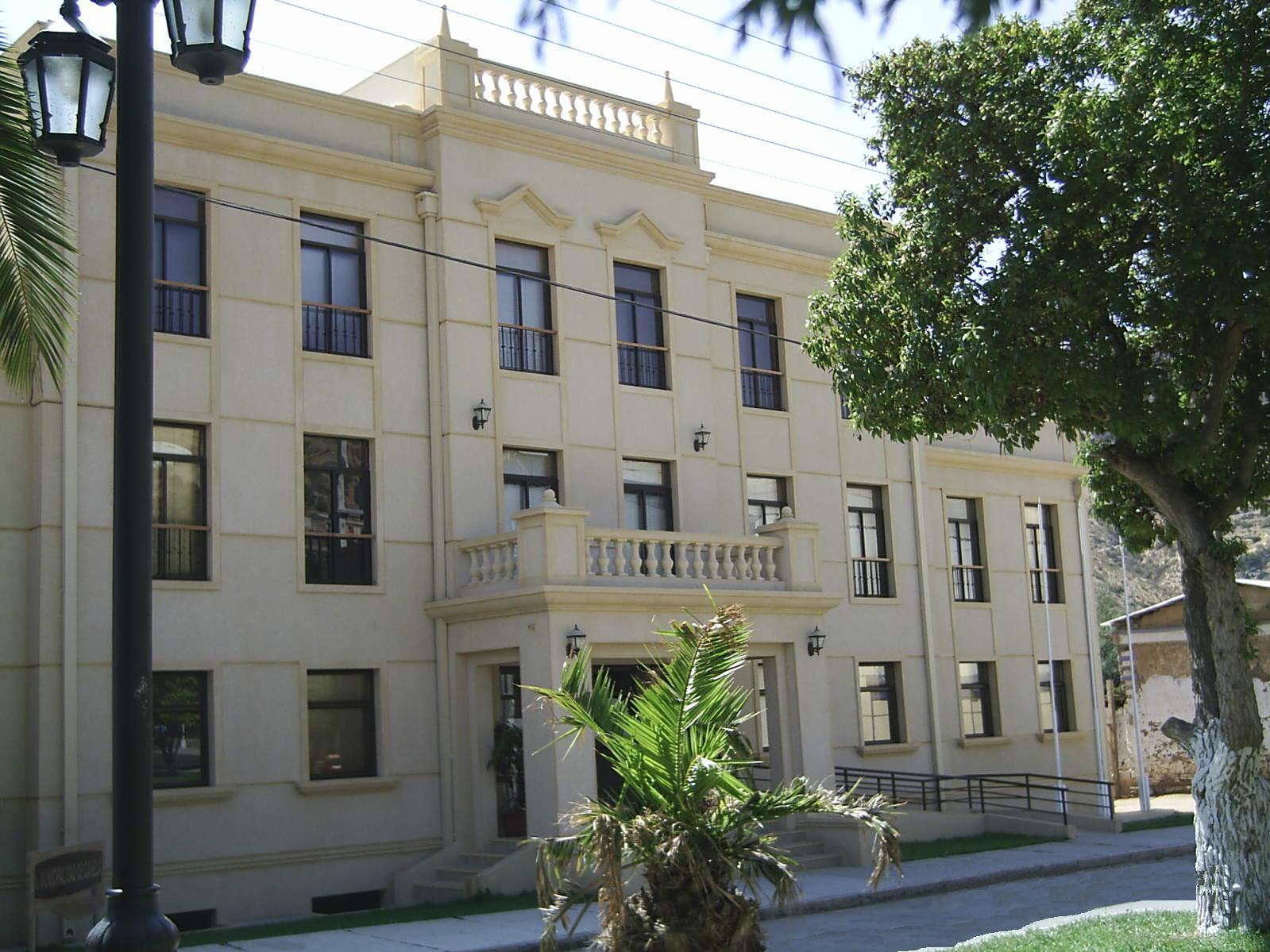
Municipal building at Luis Infante Nº 520 in Canela Baja.

As a commune, Canela is administered by a municipal council, headed by a directly elected alcalde. The municipal building (alcaldía) is located at Luis Infante Nº 520 in Canela Baja. The commune is administered by alcalde Juan Bernardo Leyton Lemus (Independent-PC) from 2012 to 2016, who won the election with 50,21% of the vote against 41,15% of his nearest rival, former mayor Norman Araya Araya (Independent). The commune has a total of six councilors:

1. Manuel Ángel Navarro Vega (PC)
2. Ana Margarita Vega Flores (PPD)
3. Miguel Pereira Bugueño (RN)
4. Darwin Cortés Palma (UDI)
5. Néstor Valle Tapia (PC-Ind.)
6. Gustavo Gallardo Trigo (PDC)

Canela belongs to the 9th electoral district and the 4th Senate District (for that of the Coquimbo Region). It is represented in the Chamber of Deputies of the National Congress by the Members Jorge Insunza Gregorio de las Heras (PPD) and Luis Lemus (PS). Currently, Coquimbo is represented in the Senate by Jorge Pizarro (PDC) and Adriana Muñoz (PPD).

== Geography ==
Canela spans an area of 2,196.6 km (1,365 mi). The commune is bordered to the west by the Pacific Ocean and to the north by three communes of the Limarí Province: Ovalle, Punitaqui, and Combarbalá to the north and east. To the southeast lies the commune of Illapel, and Los Vilos borders on the south. Canela Baja is located approximately 12 km (7 mi) east of the Panamerican Highway, Route 5, at kilometer 299.

== Climate ==
The waters of the Canela stream flow into the Choapa River, which drains into the Pacific Ocean. The area's climate is steppe or semiarid. The average annual precipitation is about 169.51 mm (7 in).

== Demographics ==
According to data from the 2002 Census of Population and Housing, the Canela commune had 9,379 inhabitants; of these, 1,744 (18.9%) lived in urban areas and 7,635 (81.4%) in rural areas. Thus, the Canela population represents 1.5% of regional population and 11.4% of the provincial population.
