= Illapel River =

Coordinates: 31.5638°S 70.9726°W

Location
- Country: Chile

Physical characteristics
- Mouth
  - location: Choapa River
- Length: 85 km (53 mi)
- Basin size: 2,100 km^{2} (810 sq mi)

The Illapel River is a river of Chile located in the Coquimbo Region. One of its most important tributaries is Aucó Creek. The Las Chinchillas National Reserve is located in the Aucó Creek basin.

The city of Illapel is located on its north shore, about 12 km (7.5 mi) upstream from the confluence with the Choapa River.
