= Sergio Gahona =

Chilean politician

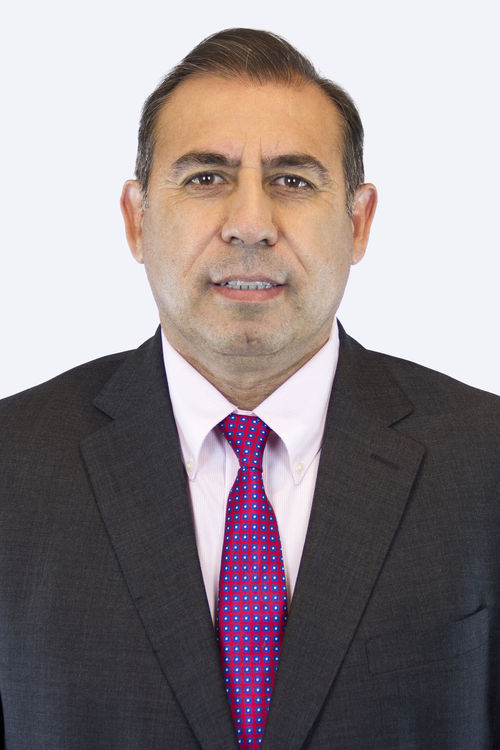

Member of the Senate of Chile
- Incumbent
- Assumed office 11 March 2022
- Preceded by: Creation of the circumscription
- Constituency: 5th Circumscription (Coquimbo Region)

Member of the Chamber of Deputies
- In office 11 March 2018 – 11 March 2022
- Preceded by: Creation of the district
- Constituency: District 5
- In office 11 March 2014 – 11 March 2018
- Preceded by: Mario Bertolino
- Succeeded by: Dissolution of the Office
- Constituency: 5th District (Andacollo, La Higuera, La Serena, Paihuano and Vicuña)

Intendant of the Coquimbo Region
- In office 11 March 2010 – 15 November 2012
- Preceded by: Ricardo Cifuentes
- Succeeded by: Mario Burlé

Personal details
- Born: 15 September 1965 (age 61) Antofagasta, Chile
- Party: Independent Democratic Union (UDI)
- Spouse: Ingrid Jacob
- Children: Three
- Parent(s): Sergio Gahona A. Ruth Salazar
- Education: University of Antofagasta (B.A. in Midwifery); Catholic University of the North (B.A. in Education) (MA in Business Administration); Diego Portales University (M.A. in Educational Planification)
- Occupation: Politician
- Profession: Midwifery

Sergio Alfredo Gahona Salazar (born 15 September 1965) is a Chilean politician who is currently serving as senator.

== Biography ==
Gahona Salazar was born on 15 September 1965 in Antofagasta, the son of Sergio Alfredo Gahona Aragón and Ruth Miriams Salazar Alday. He is married to Edith Leonor Rivera Hidalgo and is the father of three children: Pablo, Paulina, and Isabel.

He completed his secondary education at the Liceo de Hombres of Antofagasta. He later studied at the University of Antofagasta, where he obtained the professional degree of midwife (matrón). Subsequently, he earned a Bachelor’s degree in Education from the Catholic University of the North.

He pursued postgraduate studies, completing a Master’s degree in Educational Planning and Management at the Universidad Diego Portales and a Master’s degree in Business Administration at the Catholic University of the North.

=== Professional career ===
Between 1995 and 2009, Gahona served as director of the Center for Technical Training and Professional Institute campus in Calama, Antofagasta Region, and later as campus vice-rector of the INACAP Technological University in La Serena.

== Political career ==
Gahona is a member of the Independent Democratic Union (UDI). He served on the Education; Labor; and Projects and Infrastructure Committees of the Regional Education Council.

In the 2009 parliamentary elections, he ran unsuccessfully for the Chamber of Deputies of Chile representing District No. 7 for the term 2010–2014 as a candidate of the Independent Democratic Union, obtaining 15,614 votes (17.56% of the valid votes).

On 11 March 2010, he was appointed Intendant of the Coquimbo Region by President Sebastián Piñera. He served in that position until 15 November 2012, when he resigned to run for a seat in the Chamber of Deputies in the 2013 parliamentary elections.

In the 2013 parliamentary elections, Gahona was elected to the Chamber of Deputies of Chile representing District No. 7 of the Coquimbo Region for the term 2014–2018, obtaining 20,507 votes (23.80% of the valid votes). In November 2017, he was re-elected representing the newly created District No. 5 of the Coquimbo Region for the term 2018–2022, obtaining the highest vote share in the district with 27,332 votes (11.78%).

On 28 December 2020, he assumed the position of national vice president of the Independent Democratic Union, serving on the party leadership for the period 2021–2022 under the presidency of Deputy Javier Macaya.

In 2021, Gahona registered his candidacy for the Senate of Chile representing the Independent Democratic Union within the Chile Podemos Más coalition, for the 5th Senatorial District of the Coquimbo Region (term 2022–2030). In November 2021, he was elected with 25,751 votes, corresponding to 10.57% of the valid votes cast.

== Honors and distinctions ==
On 25 June 2019, Gahona received the Star of Bethlehem decoration, awarded by the State of Palestine in recognition of his work in support of human rights, freedom, solidarity with the Palestinian people, and the strengthening of relations between both nations.
