= Choapa Province =

Choapa
- Province
- Seal

- Location in the Coquimbo Region

- Location in Chile
- Coordinates: 31°40′S 71°00′W
- Country: Chile
- Region: Coquimbo
- Capital: Illapel
- Communes: List of 4: Illapel; Salamanca, Chile; Los Vilos; Canela

Government
  - Type: Provincial

Area
  - Total: 10,131.6 km^{2} (3,911.8 sq mi)

Population (2024 Census)
  - Total: 92,350
  - Density: 9.115/km^{2} (23.61/sq mi)
- Time zone: UTC−4 (CLT)
  - Summer (DST): UTC-3 (CLST)
- Area code: 56 + 53
- Website: Government of Choapa

Choapa Province is a province in the Coquimbo Region of Chile. Its capital is Illapel. Spread over an area of 10,136.6 km^{2} (3,913.8 sq mi), it had a population of 92,350 inhabitants as per the 2024 Chilean census. The province was established by law on 1 August 1974. It is one of the major wine producing regions in Chile.

== History ==
The Coquimbo Region was established on 1 August 1974, from the erstwhile Intendency of Coquimbo, which had been established on 23 September 1811. It is divided into three provinces: Choapa, Limarí and Elqui, which are further divided into 18 communes.

== Geography ==
Choapa Province is one of the provinces of the Coquimbo Region in Chile. It spans an area of 10,136.6 km^{2} (3,913.8 sq mi) and has its capital at Illapel. The province is divided into four communes–Illapel, Salamanca, Los Vilos, and Canela.

The province is located in the Choapa Valley, which is one of the major wine producing regions in Chile. It is located in the narrowest part of Chile, with less than 100 km (62 mi) width between the Andes mountains in the east and the Pacific Ocean in the west. The region has an arid climate with an average of only 10 cm (3.9 in) rainfall annually. The vineyards are planted on rocky, foothill soils and produce high quality Syrah and Cabernet Sauvignon grapes, which have a high acidity and low pH.

The economy has been dependent on agriculture and mining previously. However, years of mining, has left huge toxic wastes, which have polluted the water bodies. The region faced severe drought in the 2010s due to increased desertification, and shortage of water in the Illapel and Choapa Rivers.

== Demographics ==
According to the 2024 Chilean census, the province had a population of 92,350 inhabitants. The population consisted of 46,880 females (50.8%) and 45,470 males (49.2%). About 18.2% of the population was below the age of 15 years, 64.7% belonged to the age group of 15–64 years, and 17.2% was aged 65 years or older. The province had an urban population of 55,845 inhabitants (60.5%) and a rural population of 36,505 inhabitants (39.5%). Most of the residents were born in Chile, accounting for 88,621 inhabitants (96%). Non-indigenous people formed the majority of the population with 83,603 inhabitants (90.5%), while 8,740 inhabitants (9.5%) identified themselves as belonging to indigenous groups. Roman Catholics formed the largest religious group with 48,519 adherents (64.4%), followed by 16,628 inhabitants (22.1%) indicating no religious affiliation, and Evangelicals or Protestants with 8,323 adherents (11%).

== See also ==
- Chilean wine
- Elqui Valley
