= Los Vilos =

- City and Commune
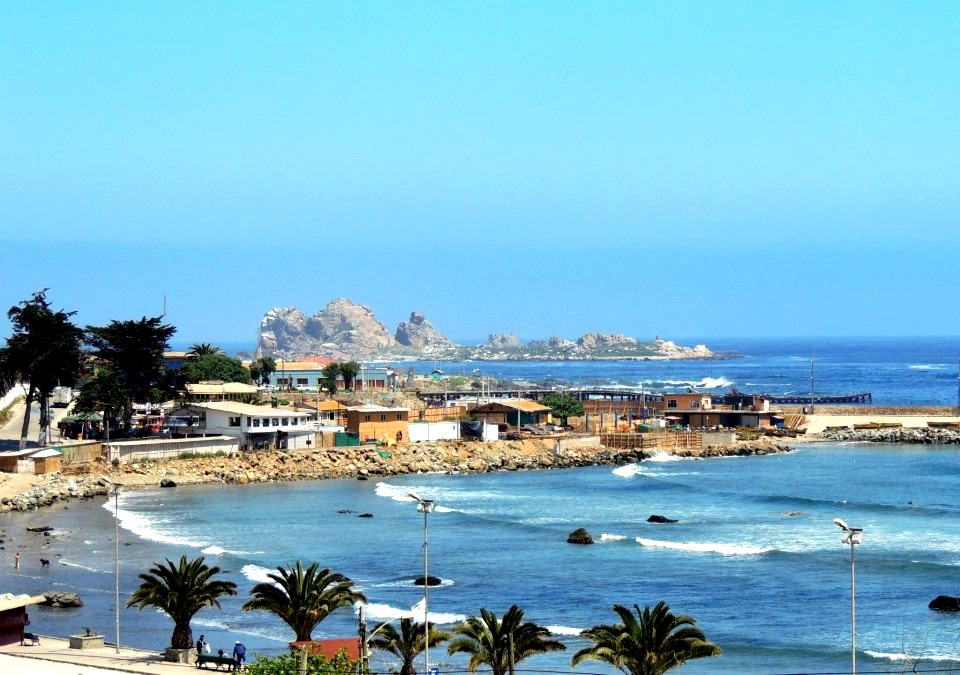

- Coat of arms Location in Chile
- Coordinates (city): 31°55′S 71°31′W
- Country: Chile
- Region: Coquimbo
- Province: Choapa
- Founded: 1835
- Declared Harbor: 1855

Government
  - Type: Municipality

Area
  - Total: 1,860.6 km^{2} (718.4 sq mi)
- Elevation: 11 m (36 ft)

Population (2012 Census)
  - Total: 18,275
  - Density: 9.8221/km^{2} (25.439/sq mi)
  - Urban: 12,859
  - Rural: 4,594
- Demonym: vileño(a)

Sex
  - Men: 8,858
  - Women: 8,595
- Time zone: UTC−4 (CLT)
  - Summer (DST): UTC−3 (CLST)
- Area code: 56 + 53
- Website: Municipality of Los Vilos

Los Vilos (from Mapuche: Filu, ‘snake’) is both a Chilean coastal commune and a coastal city with over 9,000 inhabitants (18,275 in comuna), located in the Province of Choapa, part of the IV Region of Coquimbo. The city has a harbour called Puerto Punta Chungo, that ships the material of Los Pelambres mine. This port stand for 1.1% of the annual tonnage of Chile's external trade as of 2024. Fishing is one of its main activities. The city also has a significant amount of tourism, mainly due to its two beaches: La Principal and Las Conchas. It is located at 246 kilometres (153 mi) from La Serena and 246 kilometres (153 mi) from Santiago.

The city was founded in 1830, and was declared a minor harbor in 1855.

== History ==
Los Vilos has existed as a small informal settlement since 1835, when the government realised that a port was needed in that region to expand the reach of commerce in the country. On January 3, 1855, it was declared a minor port by then president, Manuel Montt and by his Minister of Finance, José María Berganza, through a supreme decree of the Finance Ministry.

On April of that same year a permission was granted by the government to start the construction of a dock, warehouses and commerce related buildings. In December 1857, it was determined that a town needed to be built so 25 blocks, that used to belong to the Conchali Hacienda, were designed and sold by Hernán Jequier as a public utility. The town was located around the small pre-existing settlement.

The port responded to the need to regulate the commerce in the area, so a customs office, that depended on the Valparaíso custom, was created. The economy of Los Vilos initially depended largely on commerce.

== Demographics ==
According to the 2002 census of the National Statistics Institute, Los Vilos spans an area of 1,860.6 km^{2} (718 sq mi) and has 17,453 inhabitants (8,858 men and 8,595 women). Of these, 12,859 (73.7%) lived in urban areas and 4,594 (26.3%) in rural areas. The population grew by 10.4% (1,648 persons) between the 1992 and 2002 censuses.

== Administration ==
As a commune, Los Vilos is a third-level administrative division of Chile administered by a municipal council, headed by an alcalde who is directly elected every four years.

The current alcalde is Manuel Marcarián Julio (an independent that is part of the New Majority pact, and the current council has the following members

- Christian Gross Hidalgo (PS)
- Iris Hidalgo (UDI
- Juan Hisi Espinoza (PRI)
- Berta Martínez (RN)
- Héctor Molina Fuenzalida (PPD)
- Julio Werner (DC)

Within the electoral divisions of Chile, Los Vilos is represented in the Chamber of Deputies by Adriana Muñoz (PDC) and Luis Lemus (Ind.) as part of the 9th electoral district, (together with Combarbalá, Punitaqui, Monte Patria, Illapel, Salamanca and Canela). The commune is represented in the Senate by Adriana Muñoz (PPD) and Jorge Pizarro Soto (PDC) as part of the 4th senatorial constituency (Coquimbo Region).

== Tourism ==
The comuna has a considerable amount of tourism, in both the Los Vilos City, and in the small coastal town of Pichidangui.
