= Illapel =

- City and Commune
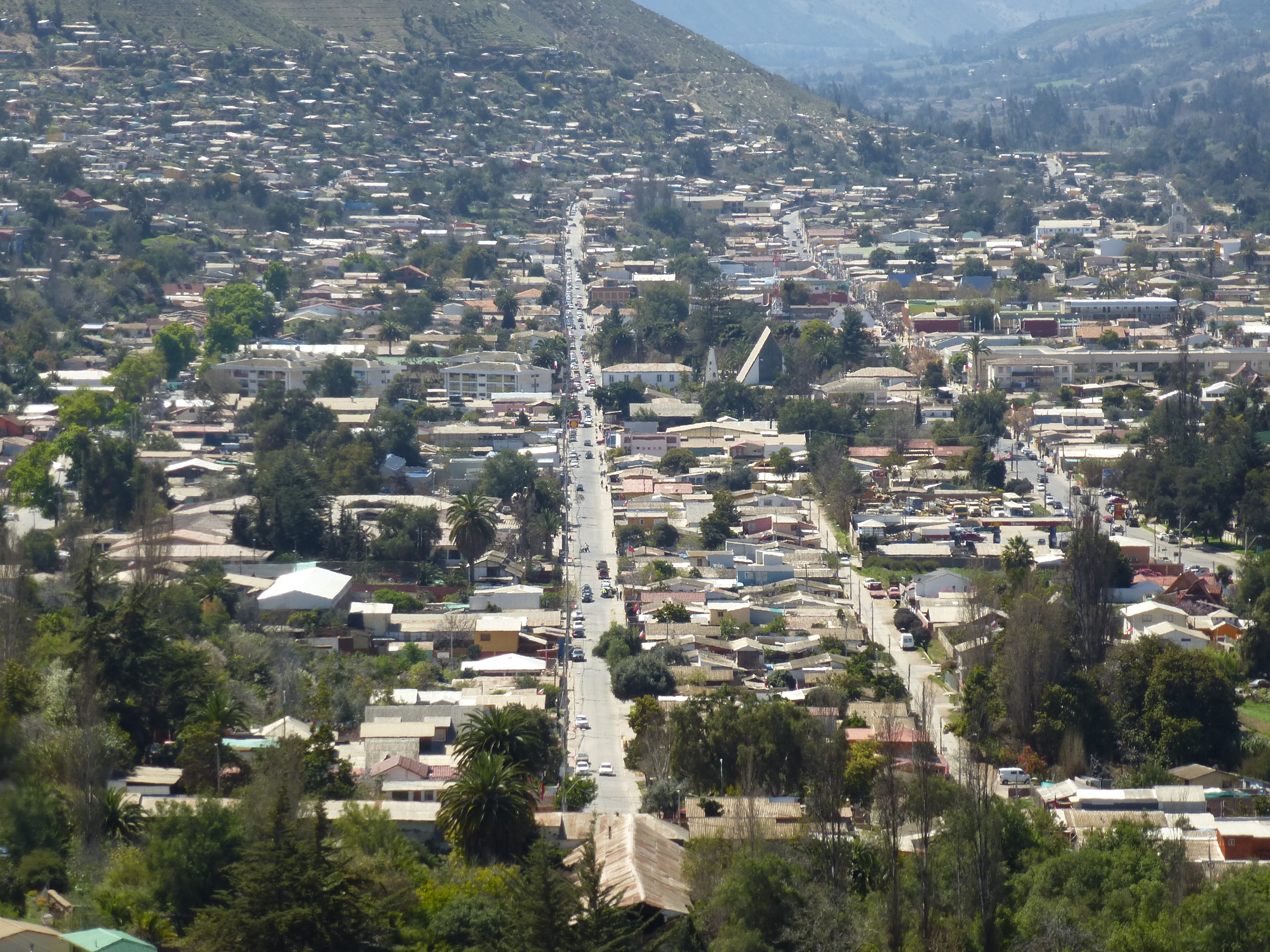

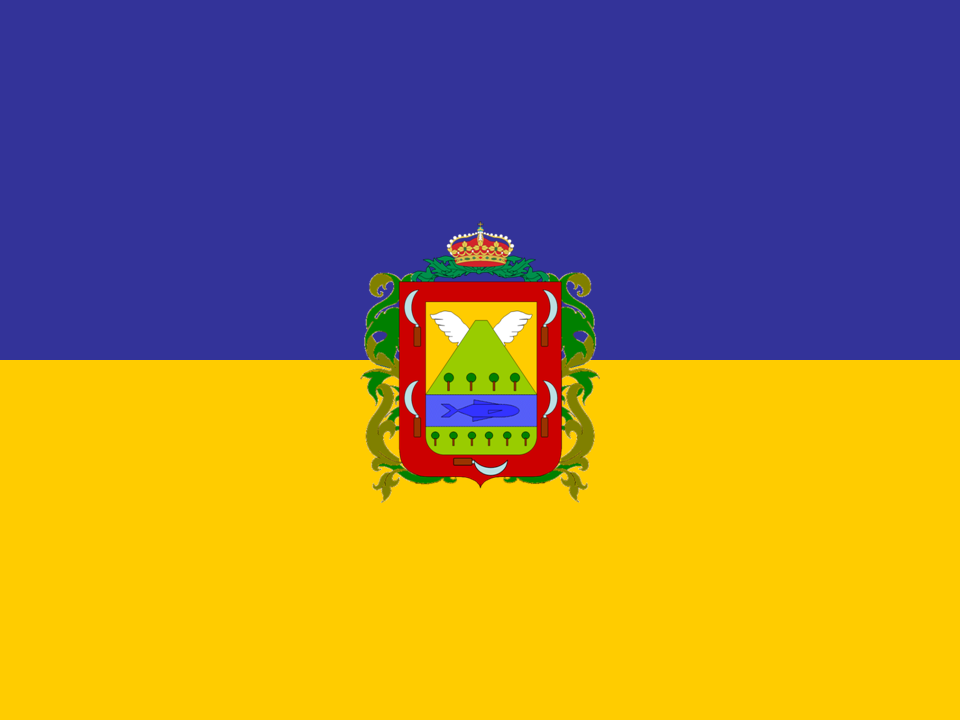
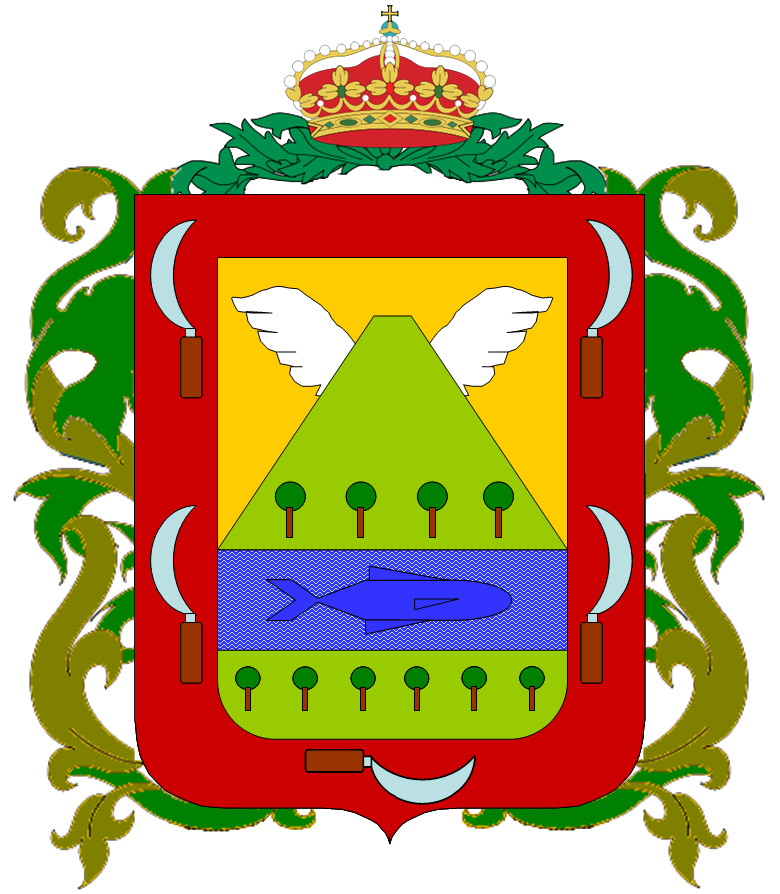
- Flag Coat of arms Location of Illapel commune in the Coquimbo Region Location in Chile
- Coordinates: 31°38′S 71°10′W
- Country: Chile
- Region: Coquimbo
- Province: Choapa
- Founded: 1752

Government
  - Type: Municipality
  - Alcalde: Denis Cortés Vargas (IND/JPM)

Area
  - Total: 2,629.1 km^{2} (1,015.1 sq mi)
- Elevation: 388 m (1,273 ft)

Population (2012 Census)
  - Total: 30,074
  - Density: 11.439/km^{2} (29.627/sq mi)
  - Urban: 21,826
  - Rural: 8,529
- Demonym: Illapelino

Sex
  - Men: 14,940
  - Women: 15,415
- Time zone: UTC−4 (CLT)
  - Summer (DST): UTC−3 (CLST)
- Area code: 56 + 53
- Climate: BSk
- Website: Official website (in Spanish)

Illapel (Spanish pronunciation: [i.ʝa.ˈpel]) is a Chilean city, which is the capital of the Choapa Province, Coquimbo Region. It lies along the Illapel River and marks the country's narrowest point along a parallel (94 km). It is located to the east of Los Vilos.

== Administration ==
As a commune, Illapel is a third-level administrative division of Chile administered by a municipal council, headed by an alcalde who is directly elected every four years. The 2008–2012 alcalde was Denis Cortés Vargas (IND/JPM).

Within the electoral divisions of Chile, Illapel is represented in the Chamber of Deputies by Adriana Muñoz (PDC) and Luis Lemus (Ind.) as part of the 9th electoral district, (together with Combarbalá, Punitaqui, Monte Patria, Salamanca, Los Vilos, Canela). The commune is represented in the Senate by Evelyn Matthei Fornet (UDI) and Jorge Pizarro Soto (PDC) as part of the 4th senatorial constituency (Coquimbo Region).

== Demographics ==
According to the 2002 census of the National Statistics Institute, Illapel spans an area of 2,629.1 km^{2} (1,015 sq mi) and has 30,355 inhabitants (14,940 men and 15,415 women). Of these, 21,826 (71.9%) lived in urban areas and 8,529 (28.1%) in rural areas. The population grew by 4.6% (1,348 persons) between the 1992 and 2002 censuses.

== Earthquake of September 16, 2015 ==
On September 16, 2015, at 22:54:33 UTC (19:54:33 local time), a great earthquake of magnitude 8.3 hit the area, with an epicenter 46 km (29 mi) west of Illapel. The earthquake caused physical damage, the loss of human lives, forced the evacuation of one million people from the coast (some sources mistakenly claimed a million people evacuated from Santiago), and a tsunami warning was issued for parts of South America, Hawaii, California and French Polynesia. Copper prices spiked in early trading, on fears of supply disruption.

== See also ==
- Las Chinchillas National Reserve
