= Choapa River =

River in the Coquimbo Region, Chile

Coordinates: 31°37′40″S 71°33′30″W

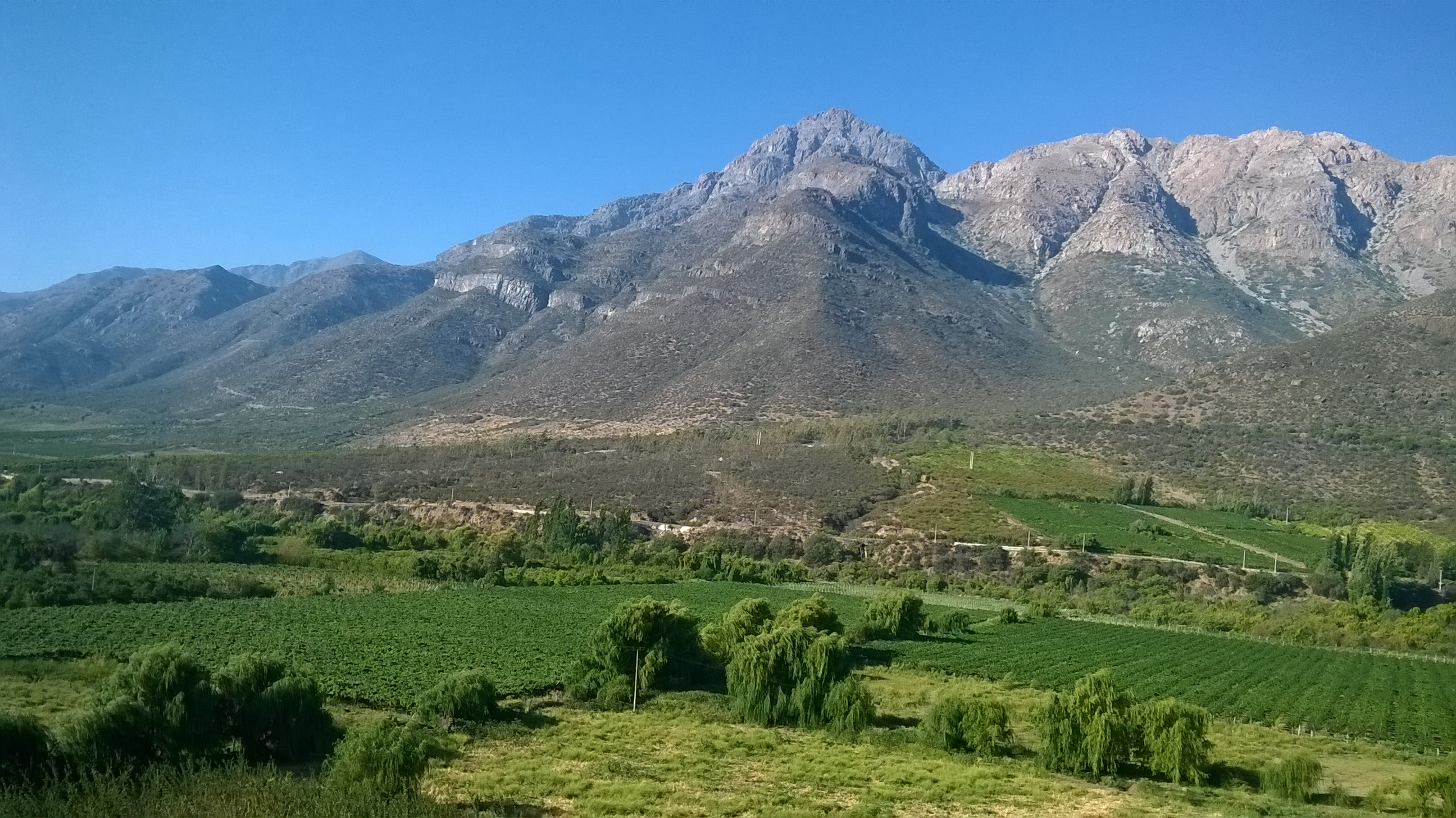
- View of Choapa Valley from the vicinity of Salamanca

Location
- Country: Chile

Physical characteristics
- Source
  - elevation: 1,000 m (3,300 ft)
- Mouth
  - location: Pacific Ocean
- Length: 160 km (99 mi)
- Basin size: 8,124 km^{2} (3,137 sq mi)

Choapa River or El Río Choapa is a river of Chile located in the Coquimbo Region. The river rises in the Andes, at the confluence of the streams Totoral, Leiva and Del Valle. The river then flows through the town of Salamanca before it meets with its main tributary, the Illapel River. The Choapa then empties into the Pacific Ocean in the vicinity of Huentelauquén Cove, about 35 km north of Los Vilos.

The major settlement along the river is Salamanca.

== See also ==
- List of rivers of Chile
