= Jorge Pizarro =

Chilean politician

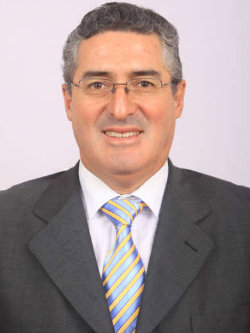

Member of the Senate
- In office 11 March 1998 – 11 March 2022
- Preceded by: Ricardo Hormazábal
- Succeeded by: Matías Walker
- Constituency: Coquimbo Region

President of the Senate of Chile
- In office 11 March 2010 – 15 March 2011
- Preceded by: Jovino Novoa
- Succeeded by: Guido Guirardi Lavín

Member of the Chamber of Deputies
- In office 11 March 1990 – 11 March 1998
- Preceded by: District created
- Constituency: 8th District

Personal details
- Born: 21 April 1952 (age 73) Ovalle, Chile
- Party: Christian Democratic

Jorge Pizarro Soto (born 21 April 1952) is a Chilean politician who served as parliamentary from 1990 to 2022.

Since March 1998 he has been a senator for Coquimbo and was the president of the senate from 2010 to 2011. He is a member of the Christian Democratic Party. He is also a member of the editorial committee of the Cambio 21 newspaper.

In the professional field, he worked as a transport entrepreneur.

== Biography ==
He was born on 21 April 1952 in the city of Ovalle. He is the son of Luis Bernardo Pizarro Pizarro and Marta Soto García.

He is married to Rocío del Pilar Peñafiel Salas and is the father of five children.

He completed his secondary education at the Internado Nacional Barros Arana and pursued university studies at the School of Government and Public Management of the University of Chile, which he did not complete.

In May 2020, during the COVID-19 pandemic, he became the second Chilean politician to be confirmed with COVID-19.

== Political career ==
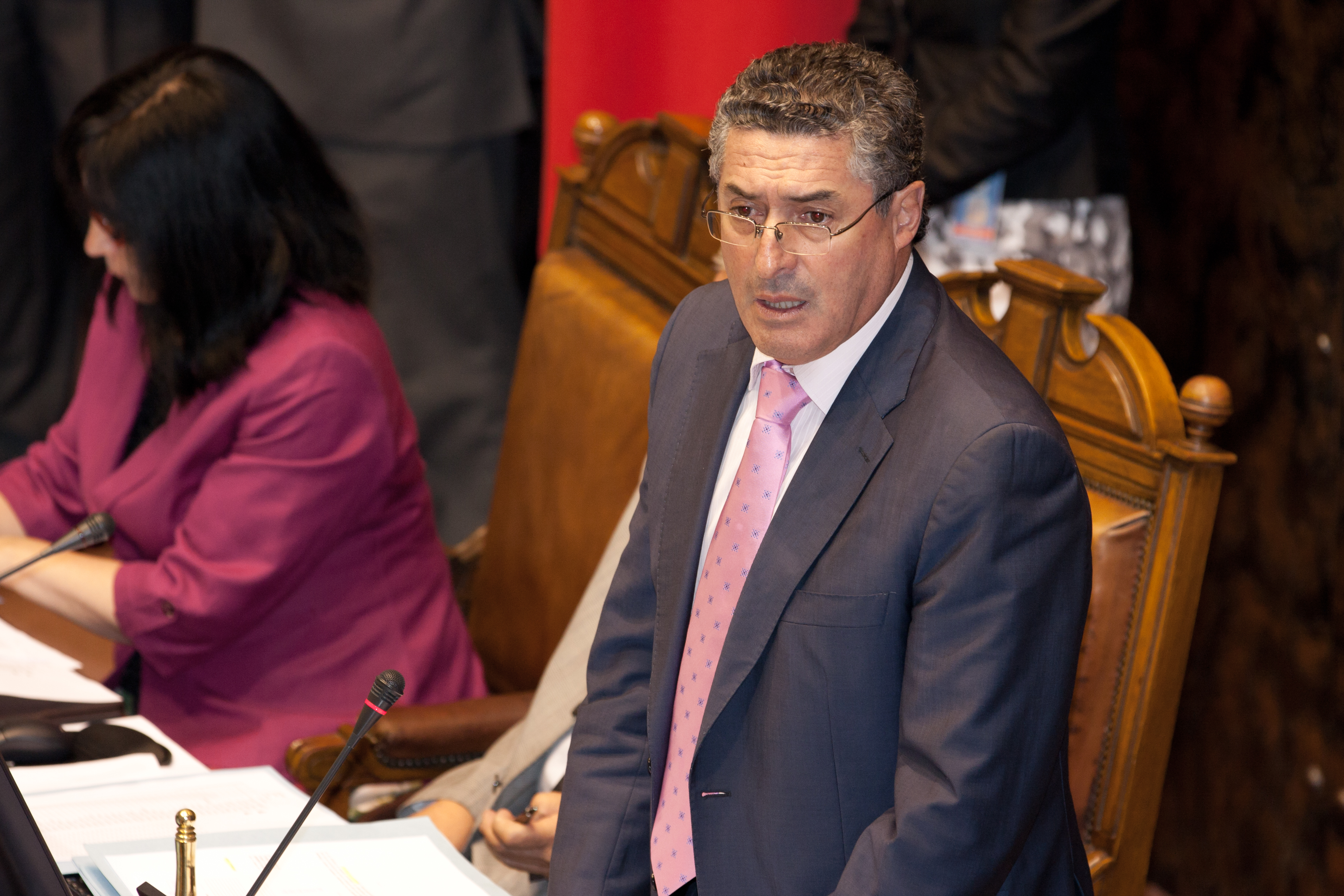
Jorge Pizarro as President of the Senate of Chile (2011).

He began his political career in 1971 as a student leader in the Federation of Students of the University of Chile (FECh), remaining active until 1973.

On 19 June 1973, he was among those detained during a police raid on the headquarters of Canal 6 of the University of Chile, after the government declared the station’s broadcasts illegal. This episode later triggered a constitutional accusation and led to the dismissal of the Minister of the Interior, Gerardo Espinoza Carrillo.

He later joined the Christian Democratic Party's youth wing (JDC), which he presided over between 1977 and 1979. Between 1982 and 1987, he served as Secretary-General of the World Union of Christian Democratic Youth, consolidating his early leadership within the party.

In the 1989 parliamentary elections, he was elected to the Chamber of Deputies for the 8th District –Coquimbo, Ovalle and Río Hurtado– for the 1990–1994 term, and was re-elected in 1993 for the 1994–1998 term. During this period, he served on standing committees related to foreign relations, economy and inter-parliamentary affairs.

In 1997, he was elected Senator for Senatorial Circumscription No. 4 ―Coquimbo Region―, serving consecutive terms from 1998 to 2022. As senator, he presided over several key standing committees, including Public Works, Transport and Telecommunications, Economy, and Internal Regime, and played a prominent role in foreign affairs and budgetary oversight.

At the international level, he held senior parliamentary positions, including Secretary-General and later President of the Latin American Parliament (Parlatino), and served as co-president of the Euro-Latin American Parliamentary Assembly (Eurolat).

He was elected President of the Senate of Chile for the 2010–2011 term and again between 2013 and 2014. On 29 March 2015, he was elected National President of the PDC, resigning from the position in April 2016. In June 2019, he was elected President of the Parlatino for the 2019–2021 term. On 17 March 2021, he was elected Vice President of the Senate alongside Senator Yasna Provoste, who assumed the presidency of the chamber.
